= Elgamal =

Elgamal may refer to:

- ElGamal encryption, an asymmetric key encryption algorithm for public-key cryptography
- ElGamal signature scheme, a digital signature scheme
- Taher Elgamal (born 1955), Egyptian cryptographer
