= RSA Award for Excellence in Mathematics =

Annual award

RSAC Conference Award for Excellence in Mathematics
- Awarded for: Outstanding achievements in cryptographic research defined broadly
- Presented by: The RSA Conference
- First award: 1998

Formally called since 2025 The RSAC Conference Award for Excellence in Mathematics, is an annual award. It is announced at the annual RSA Conference in recognition of innovations and contributions in the field of cryptography. An award committee of experts, which is associated with the Cryptographer's Track committee at the RSA Conference (CT-RSA), nominates to the award persons who are pioneers in their field, and whose work has had applied or theoretical lasting value; the award is typically given for the lifetime achievements throughout the nominee's entire career. Nominees are often affiliated with universities or involved with research and development in the information technology industry. The award is cosponsored by the International Association for Cryptologic Research.

While the field of modern cryptography started to be an active research area in the 1970s, it has already contributed heavily to Information technology and has served as a critical component in advancing the world of computing: the Internet, Cellular networks, and Cloud computing, Information privacy, Privacy engineering, Anonymity, Storage security, and Information security, to mention just a few sectors and areas. Research in cryptography as a scientific field involves the disciplines of Mathematics, Computer Science, and Engineering. The award, which started in 1998, is one of the few recognitions fully dedicated to acknowledging experts who have advanced the field of cryptography and its related areas (another such recognition is achieving the rank of an IACR Fellow).

The first recipient of the award in 1998 was Shafi Goldwasser. Also, many of the award winners have gotten other recognitions, such as other prestigious awards, and the rank of fellow in various professional societies, etc.

Research in Cryptography is broad and is dedicated to numerous areas. In fact, the award has, over the years, emphasized the methodological contributions to the field which involve mathematical research in various ways, and has recognized achievements in many of the following crucial areas of research:

- Some areas are in the general Computational number theory and Computational algebra fields, or in the fields of Information theory and Computational complexity theory, where proper mathematical structures are constructed or investigated as underlying mathematics to be employed in the field of cryptography;
- Some areas are theoretical in nature, where new notions for Cryptographic primitives are defined and their security is carefully formalized as foundations of the field, some work is influenced by Quantum computing as well;
- Some areas are dedicated to designing new or improved primitives from concrete or abstract mathematical mechanisms for Symmetric-key cryptography, Public-key cryptography, and Cryptographic protocols (such as Zero-knowledge proofs, Secure multi-party computations, or Threshold cryptosystems);
- Some other areas are dedicated to Cryptanalysis: the breaking of cryptographic systems and mechanisms;
- Yet some other areas are dedicated to the actual practice of cryptography and its efficient cryptographic hardware and software implementations, to developing and deploying new actual protocols (such as the Transport Layer Security and IPsec) to be used by information technology applications and systems. Also included are research areas where principles and basic methods are developed for achieving security and privacy in computing and communication systems.

To further read on various aspects of cryptography, from history to areas of modern research, see Books on cryptography.

In addition to the Award for Excellence in Mathematics which recognizes lifetime achievement in the specific area of Cryptographic research, the RSA conference has also presented a separate lifetime achievement awards in the more general field of information security. Past recipients of this award from the field of cryptography include:

- Taher Elgamal (2009),
- Whitfield Diffie (2010),
- Ronald Rivest, Adi Shamir, and Leonard Adleman (2011),
- Martin Hellman (2012)
- Burt Kaliski (2025)

== Past recipients ==
Year	Recipient	Citation / Major Achievements
1998	Shafi Goldwasser	For pioneering theoretical foundations of modern cryptography.
1999	John Pollard	For major contributions to algebraic cryptanalysis of integer factorization and discrete logarithm.
2000	Ralph Merkle	For co-inventing public-key cryptography: the idea of key exchange and the Merkle's Puzzles.
2001	Scott Vanstone	For outstanding contributions to applied cryptography.
2002	Don Coppersmith	For exceptional contributions to symmetric and asymmetric Cryptanalysis.
2003	Mihir Bellare and Phillip Rogaway	For major contributions to practice oriented secure cryptography.
2004	Silvio Micali	For pioneering theoretical foundations of modern cryptography.
2005	Dan Boneh	For innovative designs of cryptographic primitives.
2006	Oded Goldreich	For basic contributions to the foundations of cryptography.
2007	Jacques Stern	For contributions to mathematical techniques underlying proofs of cryptographic protocols and cryptanalysis.
2008	Arjen Lenstra	For contributions to computational number theory, including to integer factorization.
2009	Neal Koblitz and Victor Miller	For inventing elliptic-curve cryptography.
2010	David Chaum	For innovating cryptographic anonymity primitives.
2011	Charles Rackoff	For computational complexity oriented cryptography, including co-inventing zero-knowledge proofs.
2012	Eli Biham	For symmetric key cryptanalysis, in particular for co-inventing differential cryptanalysis.
2012	Mitsuru Matsui	For symmetric key cryptanalysis, in particular for inventing linear cryptanalysis.
2013	Jean-Jacques Quisquater	For contributions to cryptographic engineering: hardware, standards, and practical zero-knowledge authentication.
2013	Claus P. Schnorr	For contributions to hardware oriented efficient practical zero-knowledge authentication and signatures.
2014	Bart Preneel	For contributions to applied cryptography and to the cryptanalysis and design of cryptographic hash functions.
2015	Ivan Damgård	For contributions to cryptographic hashing principles and to cryptographic protocols.
2015	Hugo Krawczyk	For contributions to hashing based message authentication codes and to applied key-agreement protocols.
2016	Ueli Maurer	For contributions to Information-theoretic Cryptography and to analysis of cryptographic schemes.
2017	Tatsuaki Okamoto	For contributions to numerous primitives and protocols within public-key cryptography.
2018	Ran Canetti	For contributions to the foundations of secure multi-party computation.
2018	Rafail Ostrovsky	For contributions to the theory and to new variants of secure multi-party computations.
2019	Tal Rabin	For contributions to distributed cryptographic protocols: Multi-Party Computations, threshold cryptography, and signature schemes.
2020	Joan Daemen and Vincent Rijmen	For major contributions to symmetric key cryptography, including the development of the Advanced Encryption Standard (AES)].
2021	David Pointcheval	For developing Provable security arguments for applied Public-key cryptographic systems and protocols.
2022	Cynthia Dwork and Moni Naor	For contributions to the foundation of privacy and to the foundations of cryptography.
2023	Paul Carl Kocher	For pioneering contributions to cryptographic hardware, and side channel attacks in particular.
2024	Craig Gentry and Oded Regev	For major contributions to Lattice-Based Cryptographic Encryption, especially for the highly utilized `Learning with Error’ based cryptosystem, and the first ‘Fully Homomorphic Encryption’ cryptosystem
2025	Shai Halevi	For contributions to Public Key Cryptography, including to Multi-Linear Maps and Obfuscation, and to Fully Homomorphic Encryption, and for the development of Advanced Cryptographic Software
2025	Victor Shoup	For contributions to Public Key Cryptography, including to Chosen-Ciphertext Secure Systems, and to underlying Algebraic Algorithms, and for the development of Advanced Cryptographic Software
2026	Yehuda Lindell	For advancing and deploying practical Multi-Party Computations and Threshold Cryptography, and for contributions to the foundations of cryptographic protocols
2026	Nigel Smart	For advancing and deploying practical Multi-Party Computations and Threshold Cryptography, and for contributions to the underlying mathematics of cryptography

== See also ==
- List of computer science awards
- List of mathematics awards

== Notes ==
Here are a few examples of videos from the award ceremonies and interviews with award winners; these give some more information about each specific award year, and demonstrate the breadth of research behind each such an award:

- 2009 Interview with V. Miller
- 2009 Interview with N. Koblitz
- 2013 Award ceremony: J.-J. Quisquater and C. P. Schnorr:
- 2014 Award ceremony: B. Preneel:
- 2015 Award ceremony: I.B. Damgård and H. Krawczyk
- 2016 Award ceremony: U. Maurer
- 2019 Award ceremony video: T. Rabin, and the Cryptographer's panel.
- 2020 Award ceremony video: J. Daemen and V. Rijmen.
- 2021 Award ceremony video: D. Pointcheval
- 2023 Award ceremony video.
- 2024 Award ceremony video.

== Test-of-Time Award RSAC Papers ==
In 2026 in RSAC conference, the inaugural RSAC Test of Time Awards are dedicated to the application and advancement of cryptography and its impact to the broader cybersecurity community, while honoring the discipline’s foundational and innovative role, and are drawn from papers presented in CT-RSA in the past. The 2026 Test of Time Award recognizes papers from the first three years of CT-RSA proceedings (2001-2003), evaluating them based on number of academic citations and the lasting industry impact of the research on the field.

Test of Time Papers for 2026:

(1) Oracle Diffie-Hellman Assumptions and an Analysis of DHIES, published in 2001 as part of the first RSAC Cryptography track in 2001, by: Michel Abdalla, Mihir Bellare, and Phillip Rogaway.

(2) Homomorphic Signature Schemes, published in 2002 by: Robert Johnson, David Molnar, Dawn Song, and David Wagner.
