= CS-Cipher =

Block cipher

General
- Designers: Jacques Stern and Serge Vaudenay
- First published: 1998

Cipher detail
- Key sizes: 128 bits
- Block sizes: 64 bits
- Structure: Feistel network
- Rounds: 8

In cryptography, CS-Cipher (for Chiffrement Symétrique) is a block cipher invented by Jacques Stern and Serge Vaudenay in 1998. It was submitted to the NESSIE project, but was not selected.

The algorithm uses a key length between 0 and 128 bits (length must be a multiple of 8 bits). By default, the cipher uses 128 bits. It operates on blocks of 64 bits using an 8-round Feistel network and is optimized for 8-bit processors. The round function is based on the fast Fourier transform and uses the binary expansion of e as a source of "nothing up my sleeve numbers".
