= XMX =

XMX may refer to:

- xmx, a block cipher
- XMX (XM), a satellite radio station
- Maden language, an Austronesian language of West Papua
