= Quisquater =

Quisquater is a surname. Notable people with the surname include:

- Jean-Jacques Quisquater (born 1945), Belgian cryptographer
- Sergio Quisquater (born 1955), Belgian singer
