= Forking lemma =

The forking lemma is any of a number of related lemmas in cryptography research. The lemma states that if an adversary (typically a probabilistic Turing machine), on inputs drawn from some distribution, produces an output that has some property with non-negligible probability, then with non-negligible probability, if the adversary is re-run on new inputs but with the same random tape, its second output will also have the property.

This concept was first used by David Pointcheval and Jacques Stern in "Security proofs for signature schemes," published in the proceedings of Eurocrypt 1996. In their paper, the forking lemma is specified in terms of an adversary that attacks a digital signature scheme instantiated in the random oracle model. They show that if an adversary can forge a signature with non-negligible probability, then there is a non-negligible probability that the same adversary with the same random tape can create a second forgery in an attack with a different random oracle. The forking lemma was later generalized by Mihir Bellare and Gregory Neven. The forking lemma has been used and further generalized to prove the security of a variety of digital signature schemes and other random-oracle based cryptographic constructions.

== Statement of the lemma ==
The generalized version of the lemma is stated as follows. Let A be a probabilistic algorithm, with inputs (x, h_{1}, ..., h_{q}; r) that outputs a pair (J, y), where r refers to the random tape of A (that is, the random choices A will make). Suppose further that IG is a probability distribution from which x is drawn, and that H is a set of size h from which each of the h_{i} values are drawn according to the uniform distribution. Let acc be the probability that on inputs distributed as described, the J output by A is greater than or equal to 1.

We can then define a "forking algorithm" F_{A} that proceeds as follows, on input x:

1. Pick a random tape r for A.
2. Pick h_{1}, ..., h_{q} uniformly from H.
3. Run A on input (x, h_{1}, ..., h_{q}; r) to produce (J, y).
4. If J = 0, then return (0, 0, 0).
5. Pick h'_{J}, ..., h'_{q} uniformly from H.
6. Run A on input (x, h_{1}, ..., h_{J−1}, h'_{J}, ..., h'_{q}; r) to produce (J', y').
7. If J' = J and h_{J} ≠ h'_{J} then return (1, y, y'), otherwise, return (0, 0, 0).

Let frk be the probability that F_{A} outputs a triple starting with 1, given an input x chosen randomly from IG. Then

$$\text{frk} \geq \text{acc} \cdot \left ( \frac{\text{acc}}{q} - \frac{1}{h} \right).$$

=== Intuition ===
The idea here is to think of A as running two times in related executions, where the process "forks" at a certain point, when some but not all of the input has been examined. In the alternate version, the remaining inputs are re-generated but are generated in the normal way. The point at which the process forks may be something we only want to decide later, possibly based on the behavior of A the first time around: this is why the lemma statement chooses the branching point (J) based on the output of A. The requirement that h_{J} ≠ h'_{J} is a technical one required by many uses of the lemma. (Note that since both h_{J} and h'_{J} are chosen randomly from H, then if h is large, as is usually the case, the probability of the two values not being distinct is extremely small.)

=== Example ===
For example, let A be an algorithm for breaking a digital signature scheme in the random oracle model. Then x would be the public parameters (including the public key) A is attacking, and h_{i} would be the output of the random oracle on its ith distinct input. The forking lemma is of use when it would be possible, given two different random signatures of the same message, to solve some underlying hard problem. An adversary that forges once, however, gives rise to one that forges twice on the same message with non-negligible probability through the forking lemma. When A attempts to forge on a message m, we consider the output of A to be (J, y) where y is the forgery, and J is such that m was the Jth unique query to the random oracle (it may be assumed that A will query m at some point, if A is to be successful with non-negligible probability). (If A outputs an incorrect forgery, we consider the output to be (0, y).)

By the forking lemma, the probability (frk) of obtaining two good forgeries y and y' on the same message but with different random oracle outputs (that is, with h_{J} ≠ h'_{J}) is non-negligible when acc is also non-negligible. This allows us to prove that if the underlying hard problem is indeed hard, then no adversary can forge signatures.

This is the essence of the proof given by Pointcheval and Stern for a modified ElGamal signature scheme against an adaptive adversary.

== Known issues with application of forking lemma ==
The reduction provided by the forking lemma is not tight. Pointcheval and Stern proposed security arguments for Digital Signatures and Blind Signature using Forking Lemma. Claus P. Schnorr provided an attack on blind Schnorr signatures schemes, with more than $polylog(n)$ concurrent executions (the case studied and proven secure by Pointcheval and Stern). A polynomial-time attack, for $\Omega(n)$ concurrent executions, was shown in 2020 by Benhamouda, Lepoint, Raykova, and Orrù. Schnorr also suggested enhancements for securing blind signatures schemes based on discrete logarithm problem.
