= Pointcheval–Stern signature algorithm =

In cryptography, the Pointcheval–Stern signature algorithm is a digital signature scheme based on the closely related ElGamal signature scheme. It changes the ElGamal scheme slightly to produce an algorithm which has been proven secure in a strong sense against adaptive chosen-message attacks, assuming the discrete logarithm problem is intractable in a strong sense.

David Pointcheval and Jacques Stern developed the forking lemma technique in constructing their proof for this algorithm. It has been used in other security investigations of various cryptographic algorithms.
