= Superincreasing sequence =

Mathematical sequence

In mathematics, a sequence of positive real numbers $(s_1, s_2, ...)$ is called superincreasing if every element of the sequence is greater than the sum of all previous elements in the sequence.

Formally, this condition can be written as

$$s_{n+1} > \sum_{j=1}^n s_j$$

for all n ≥ 1.

== Program ==
The following Python source code tests a sequence of numbers to determine if it is superincreasing:

def is_superincreasing_sequence(sequence) -> bool:
    """Tests if a sequence is superincreasing."""
    total = 0
    result = True
    for n in sequence:
        print("Sum: ", total, "Element: ", n)
        if n <= total:
            result = False
            break
        total += n
    return result


sequence = [1, 3, 6, 13, 27, 52]
result = is_superincreasing_sequence(sequence)
print("Is it a superincreasing sequence? ", result)

This produces the following output:

Sum:  0 Element:  1
Sum:  1 Element:  3
Sum:  4 Element:  6
Sum:  10 Element:  13
Sum:  23 Element:  27
Sum:  50 Element:  52
Is it a superincreasing sequence?  True

== Examples ==
- (1, 3, 6, 13, 27, 52) is a superincreasing sequence, but (1, 3, 4, 9, 15, 25) is not.
- The series a^x for a>=2

== Properties ==
- Multiplying a superincreasing sequence by a positive real constant keeps it superincreasing.

== See also ==
- Merkle–Hellman knapsack cryptosystem
