= Jacques Stern (cryptographer) =

French cryptographer

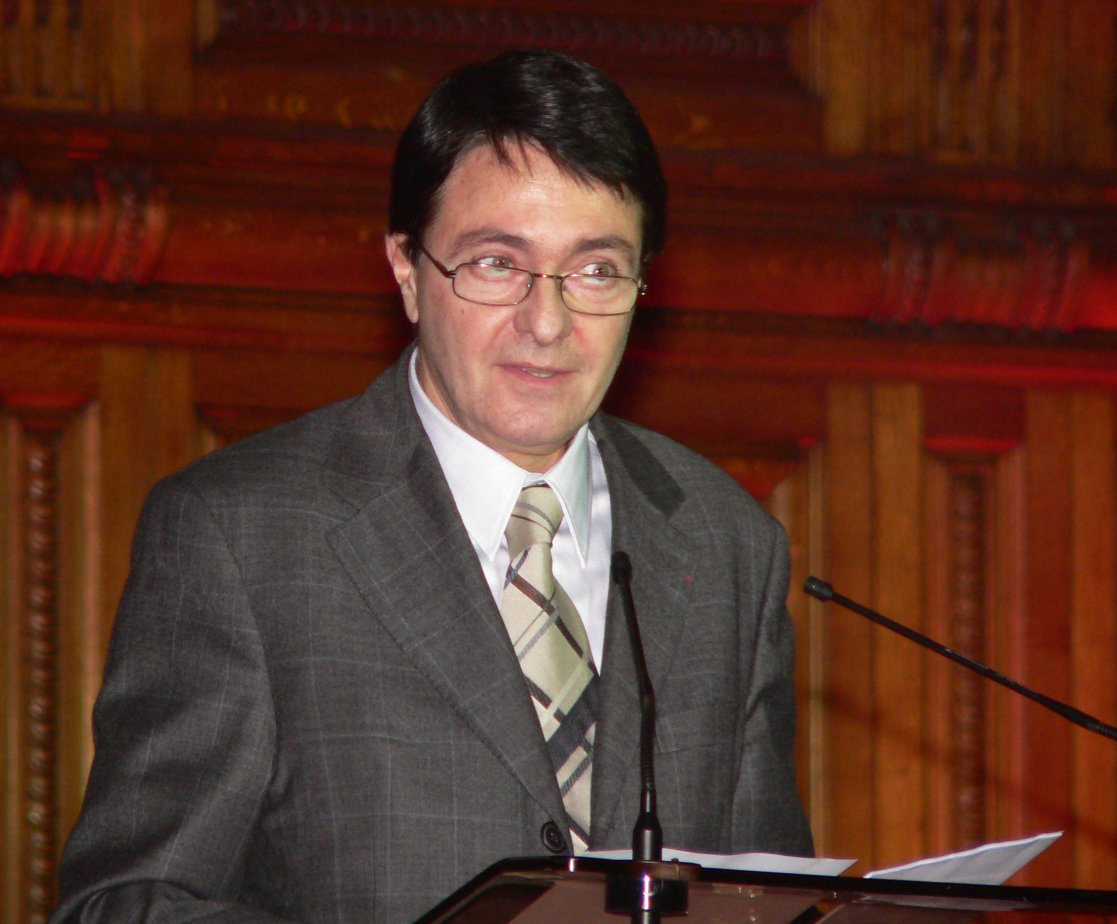
- Jacques Stern making a speech before receiving the CNRS gold medal
- Born: 21 August 1949 (age 77)
- Education: Paris Diderot University
- Known for: Pointcheval–Stern signature algorithm
- Scientific career
- Fields: Cryptography
- Workplaces: École Normale Supérieure
- Doctoral advisor: Jean-Louis Krivine
- Doctoral students: Antoine Joux; Brigitte Vallée; Serge Vaudenay; David Pointcheval

Jacques Stern (born 21 August 1949) is a cryptographer, currently a professor at the École normale supérieure. He received the 2006 CNRS Gold medal. His notable work includes the cryptanalysis of numerous encryption and signature schemes, the design of the Pointcheval–Stern signature algorithm, the Naccache–Stern cryptosystem and Naccache–Stern knapsack cryptosystem, and the block ciphers CS-Cipher, DFC, and xmx. He also contributed to the cryptanalysis of the SFLASH signature scheme.

== Awards ==
- Knight of the Légion d'honneur recipient
- 2005 CNRS Silver Medal
- IACR Fellow, 2005
- 2006 CNRS Gold medal
- 2007 RSA Award for Excellence in Mathematics
