= Claus P. Schnorr =

German mathematician and cryptographer (1943–2025)

Claus Peter Schnorr
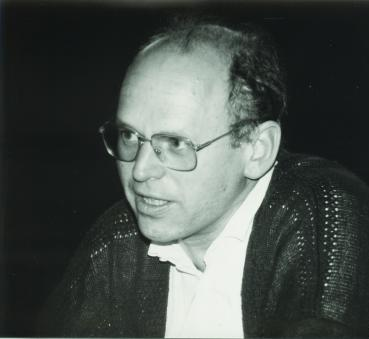
- Schnorr in 1986
- Born: 4 August 1943; Völklingen, Saarland, Germany
- Died: 8 June 2025 (aged 81)
- Education: University of Saarbrücken
- Known for: Schnorr group, Schnorr signature
- Awards: Gottfried Wilhelm Leibniz Prize
- Scientific career
- Fields: Mathematics; Cryptography
- Workplaces: Johann Wolfgang Goethe University
- Doctoral advisor: Günter Hotz

Claus Peter Schnorr (4 August 1943 – 8 June 2025) was a German mathematician and cryptographer.

== Life and career ==
Schnorr received his Ph.D. from the Saarland University in 1966, and his habilitation in 1970. Schnorr's contributions to cryptography include his study of Schnorr groups, which are used in the digital signature algorithm bearing his name. Besides this, Schnorr is known for his contributions to algorithmic information theory and for creating an approach to the definition of an algorithmically random sequence which is alternative to the concept of Martin-Löf randomness.

Schnorr was a professor of mathematics and computer science at the Johann Wolfgang Goethe University at Frankfurt. He retired in 2011 after working there for 40 years. He was also a Distinguished Associate of RSA Laboratories, and a joint recipient of the Gottfried Wilhelm Leibniz Prize together with Johannes Buchmann in 1993. He received, with Jean-Jacques Quisquater, the RSA Award for Excellence in Mathematics in 2013.

Schnorr held a patent on Schnorr signatures until February 2010. He died on 8 June 2025, at the age of 81.

== Sources ==
- Archived version of Schnorr's home page
