= Merkle's Puzzles =

Early public-key cryptosystem

In cryptography, Merkle's Puzzles is an early construction for a public-key cryptosystem, a protocol devised by Ralph Merkle in 1974 and published in 1978. It allows two parties to agree on a shared secret by exchanging messages, even if they have no secrets in common beforehand.

== Description ==
Suppose Alice and Bob wish to communicate. Bob can send a message to Alice as follows: first he creates a large number of puzzles, each of a moderate amount of difficulty — it must be possible for Alice to solve the puzzle with a moderate amount of computing effort. The puzzles are in the form of an encrypted message with an unknown key; the key must be short enough to allow a brute force attack. Bob sends all of the puzzles (i.e. encrypted messages) to Alice, who chooses one randomly, and solves it. The decrypted solution contains an identifier as well as a session key, so Alice can communicate back to Bob which puzzle she has solved. Both parties now have a common key; Alice, because she solved a puzzle, and Bob, because he sent the puzzle. Any eavesdropper (Eve, say) has a harder task — she does not know which puzzle was solved by Alice. Her best strategy is to solve all the puzzles, but since there are so many, this is more computationally expensive for Eve than it is for Alice.

=== High-level description ===
1. Bob generates 2^{N} messages containing, "This is message X. This is the symmetrical key Y", where X is a randomly generated identifier, and Y is a randomly generated secret key meant for symmetrical encryption. Hence, both X and Y are unique to each message. All the messages are encrypted in a way such that a user may conduct a brute force attack on each message with some difficulty. Bob sends all the encrypted messages to Alice.
2. Alice receives all the encrypted messages, and randomly chooses a single message to brute force. After Alice discovers both the identifier X and the secret key Y inside that message, she encrypts her clear text with the secret key Y, and sends that identifier (in cleartext) with her cipher text to Bob.
3. Bob looks up the secret key paired with that identifier, since he's the one who generated them in the first place, and deciphers Alice's cipher text with that secret key.

Note that the eavesdropper Eve can read the identifier X sent back (in cleartext) from Alice to Bob, but, without brute forcing a majority of the original messages, has no way to map that to the secret key Y that Bob and Alice are now using for their ongoing communication, because the value of X within each message was randomly generated.

== Complexity and security analysis ==
The parameters of the puzzle game can be chosen to make it considerably harder to for an eavesdropper to break the code than for the parties to communicate, but Merkle puzzles do not provide the enormous qualitative differences in difficulty that are required for (and define) security in modern cryptography.

Suppose that the number of puzzles sent by Bob is m, and it takes both Bob and Alice n steps of computation to solve one puzzle. Then both can deduce a common session key within a time complexity of O(m+n). Eve, in contrast, is required to solve all puzzles, which takes her O(mn) of time. If m ≈ n, the effort for Eve has roughly quadratic complexity compared to Alice and Bob, i.e., her computation time is on the order of the square of theirs. n should thus be selected large enough such that computation is still feasible for Alice and Bob while it surmounts the capabilities of Eve.

Quadratic complexity is typically not considered secure enough against an attacker (or on the other extreme, for large m,n, convenient enough for the participants) for practical real-world cryptographic applications. However, this scheme has the distinction of being one of the first examples of public-key cryptography, and was an inspiration for the Diffie-Hellman key exchange protocol, which has much higher complexity, relying on the discrete logarithm problem.

In 2008 Boaz Barak and Mohammad Mahmoody-Ghidary showed ("Merkle Puzzles Are Optimal") that this quadratic bound cannot be improved upon.
