= Ralph Merkle =

American cryptographer (born 1952)

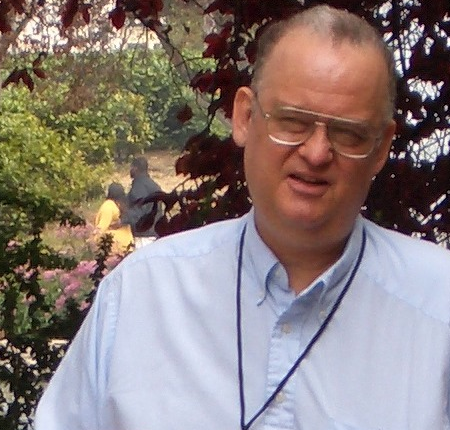
- Merkle in 2007
- Born: February 2, 1952 (age 74); Berkeley, California, United States
- Education: UC Berkeley (BA, MS); Stanford University (PhD)
- Known for: Co-inventor of public key cryptography; Merkle tree; Merkle's puzzles; Merkle–Hellman knapsack cryptosystem; Merkle–Damgård construction
- Spouse: Carol Shaw (m. 1983)
- Awards: IEEE Richard W. Hamming Medal (2010); Computer History Museum Fellow (2011)
- Scientific career
- Fields: Public key cryptography, cryonics
- Workplaces: Singularity University; Alcor Life Extension Foundation; Institute for Molecular Manufacturing; Elxsi; Georgia Institute of Technology
- Thesis: Secrecy, authentication and public key systems
- Doctoral advisor: Martin Hellman
- Website: www.ralphmerkle.com

Ralph C. Merkle (born February 2, 1952) is an American computer scientist and mathematician. He is one of the inventors of public-key cryptography, the inventor of cryptographic hashing, and more recently a researcher and speaker on cryonics.

Merkle is a renowned cryptographer, known for devising Merkle's Puzzles, co-inventing the Merkle–Hellman knapsack cryptosystem, and inventing cryptographic hashing (Merkle–Damgård construction) and Merkle trees. He has worked as a manager at Elxsi, research scientist at Xerox PARC (Palo Alto Research Center), and a nanotechnology theorist at Zyvex. Merkle has held positions as a Distinguished Professor at Georgia Tech, senior research fellow at IMM, faculty member at Singularity University, and board member at Alcor Life Extension Foundation. He received the IEEE Richard W. Hamming Medal in 2010 and has published works on molecular manipulation and self-replicating machines. Ralph Merkle is a grandnephew of baseball star Fred Merkle and is married to video game designer Carol Shaw. He serves on the board of directors of the cryonics organization Alcor Life Extension Foundation and appears in the science fiction novel The Diamond Age.

== Contributions ==
While an undergraduate, Merkle devised Merkle's Puzzles, a scheme for communication over an insecure channel, as part of a class project at UC Berkeley. The scheme is now recognized to be an early example of public key cryptography. He co-invented the Merkle–Hellman knapsack cryptosystem, invented cryptographic hashing (now called the Merkle–Damgård construction based on a pair of articles published 10 years later that established the security of the scheme), and invented Merkle trees. The Merkle–Damgård construction is at the heart of many hashing algorithms. At Xerox PARC Merkle designed the Khufu and Khafre block ciphers and the Snefru hash function.

== Career ==
Merkle was the manager of compiler development at Elxsi from 1980. In 1988, he became a research scientist at Xerox PARC. In 1999, he became a nanotechnology theorist for Zyvex. In 2003 he became a Distinguished Professor at Georgia Tech, where he led the Georgia Tech Information Security Center. In 2006 he returned to the San Francisco Bay Area, where he has been a senior research fellow at IMM, a faculty member at Singularity University, and a board member of the Alcor Life Extension Foundation. He was awarded the IEEE Richard W. Hamming Medal in 2010. He is active in the field of molecular manipulation and self-replicating machines and has published books on the subject.

== Personal life ==
Ralph Merkle is a grandnephew of baseball star Fred Merkle; son of Theodore Charles Merkle, director of Project Pluto; and brother of Judith Merkle Riley, a historical writer. Merkle is married to Carol Shaw, the video game designer best known for the 1982 Atari 2600 game River Raid.

Merkle is on the board of directors of the cryonics organization Alcor Life Extension Foundation.

Merkle appears in the science fiction novel The Diamond Age, involving nanotechnology.

== Awards ==
- 1996 Paris Kanellakis Award (from the ACM) for the Invention of Public Key Cryptography.
- 1998 Feynman Prize in Nanotechnology for computational modeling of molecular tools for atomically-precise chemical reactions
- 1999 IEEE Koji Kobayashi Computers and Communications Award
- 2000 RSA Award for Excellence in Mathematics for the invention of public key cryptography.
- 2008 International Association for Cryptographic Research (IACR) fellow for the invention of public key cryptography.
- 2010 IEEE Hamming Medal for the invention of public key cryptography
- 2011 Computer History Museum Fellow "for his work, with Whitfield Diffie and Martin Hellman, on public key cryptography."
- 2011 National Inventors Hall of Fame, for the invention of public key cryptography
- 2012 National Cyber Security Hall of Fame inductee
- 2020 Levchin Prize “for fundamental contributions to the development of public key cryptography, hash algorithms, Merkle trees, and digital signatures”
