= DigiCash =

Electronic money corporation founded by David Chaum in 1990

DigiCash Inc.
- Founded: 1989; 37 years ago
- Founder: David Chaum
- Defunct: 1998

DigiCash Inc. was an electronic money corporation founded by David Chaum in 1989. DigiCash transactions were unique in that they were anonymous due to a number of cryptographic protocols developed by its founder. DigiCash declared bankruptcy in 1998 and subsequently sold its assets to eCash Technologies, another digital currency company, which was acquired by InfoSpace on February 19, 2002.

== History ==
David Chaum is associated with the invention of Blind Signature Technology. In 1982, while studying at the University of California, Berkeley, Chaum wrote a paper describing the technological advancements to public and private key technology, in order to create this Blind Signature Technology. Chaum's Blind Signature Technology was designed to ensure the complete privacy of users who conduct online transactions. Chaum was concerned with the public nature and open access to online payments and personal information. He then proposed to construct a system of cryptographic protocols, in which a bank or the government would be unable to trace personal payments conducted online. This technology became fully implemented in 1990, through Chaum's company, DigiCash.

In 1985, Chaum published "Security Without Identification: Transaction Systems to Make Big Brother Obsolete" in Communications of the ACM, introducing his privacy arguments to a mainstream computer science audience and establishing the idea for the founding of DigiCash that came.

In 1994, DigiCash launched a public trial and gave out one million dollars in "cyberbucks" to people online. The next year, Mark Twain Bank in St. Louis became the first to accept eCash as legal tender. By 1998, 5,000 users and 300 merchants had joined the movement.

DigiCash almost secured several big deals. Visa was said to have offered $40 million for a share in the company. Microsoft wanted to include eCash in Windows 95, but the discussions around licensing did not fully go through. ING and ABN Amro also discussed partnerships worth tens of millions of dollars. Citibank negotiated seriously but later pulled out of the negotiation for reasons unrelated to DigiCash. Deutsche Bank, Credit Suisse, Australian Advance Bank, Norske Bank, and Bank Austria all licensed the technology, but none launched it widely for consumers.

In a 1999 interview, Chaum said, "As the web grew, the average level of sophistication of users dropped. It was hard to explain the importance of privacy to them."

=== Technology ===
DigiCash was a form of early electronic payment, which required user software to withdraw notes from a bank and designate specific encrypted keys before it can be sent to a recipient. This advancement of public and private key cryptography allows electronic payments to become untraceable by the issuing bank, the government, or a third party. This system of Blind Signatures through DigiCash software improved security for its users through the issuance of secured keys, which prevented third parties from accessing personal information through online transactions. The Mark Twain Bank, later acquired by Mercantile bank, located in Missouri was the only U.S. bank that supported DigiCash systems. Deutsche Bank, based in Germany, was the second backing bank of DigiCash systems.

The blinding process includes a three-step protocol that used RSA public-key cryptography. User software requested a digital token from a participating bank, which subtracted a predetermined amount from the account and returned a signed note. Prior to signing, the software will use a blinding factor. This blinding factor was a random number that used math to hide and conceal the note's serial number. The bank signed the concealed value without access to the hidden number. Then, the software removed the blinding factor, resulting in a note with a valid bank signature that the bank had not previously uncovered and seen in its final form. When a merchant submitted the note for verification, the bank would be able confirm the signature's authenticity without linking it to the original withdrawal. This process kept the client anonymous. Cryptographers refer to this property as unlinkability. In his 1982 paper, Chaum showed an example of this concept with a carbon-paper-envelope analogy: signing the outside of a sealed envelope lined with carbon paper transfers the impression to the document inside, while the signer is unable to view the authentic content.

In 1988, Chaum collaborated with Amos Fiat and Moni Naor to build the system for offline payments, with their results published in the CRYPTO '88 proceedings. The original protocol required real-time bank verification for each transaction. The Fiat-Naor extension removed this requirement by incorporating a mathematical trap in each note: spending a note once did not reveal the user's identity, but spending it twice would automatically expose identifying information across both transactions. This feature meant that honest users kept their anonymity, whereas users who attempted double-spending did not.

=== Bankruptcy ===
DigiCash was unable to grow the company successfully through the expansion of its user base. Chaum stated in an interview in 1999 that the DigiCash project, and its technology system, entered the market before e-commerce was fully integrated within the Internet. In 1998, DigiCash filed a Chapter 11 bankruptcy and in 2002 the company was sold for assets. A more modern implementation of the DigiCash approach is provided by Taler Systems SA as Free Software with the "GNU Taler" protocol.

== Legacy and influence on cryptocurrency ==
DigiCash shut down in 1998, but the cryptographic research that supported it continued.

In 1982, Chaum wrote his Berkeley dissertation, almost ten years before DigiCash started. He described a way for dishonest nodes to reach agreement and link those agreements in time-stamped blocks. In 2019, computer scientist Alan Sherman found that Chaum's dissertation included all the main parts of Bitcoin's blockchain except for proof-of-work.

Many people who worked with DigiCash later influenced other cryptocurrency projects. Nick Szabo worked in the Amsterdam office during the 1990s, later introduced the idea of "Bit Gold," and created the term "smart contracts." Hal Finney discussed eCash on the cypherpunk mailing list during the DigiCash years, and in 2009, he received the first Bitcoin transaction from Satoshi Nakamoto. Zooko Wilcox-O'Hearn, another DigiCash contributor, went on to help start Zcash, which uses zero-knowledge proofs to hide transaction details.

The cypherpunk mailing list, which started in 1992, often mentioned DigiCash. Members respected Chaum's cryptography but saw one main issue: eCash still needed a bank. Banks could be pressured, watched, or closed. Bitcoin's proof-of-work system helped solve this problem by creating digital cash without a central issuer.

Chaum decided to patent blind signatures in 1983, less than a year after the academic publication. This move later drew criticism from cypherpunks, who argued that privatizing core cryptographic primitives went against the open ethos of privacy technology.

GNU Taler, created by Taler Systems SA, is a newer anonymous payment system that uses different cryptographic methods.

== See also ==
- Digital currency
- Ecash
