= David Pointcheval =

French cryptographer

David Pointcheval is a French cryptographer. He is currently the Chief scientific officer (CSO) of Cosmian (on leave from CNRS), a French deeptech company in public cloud security. He is a Senior Researcher at CNRS, and the former head of the Computer Science Department and Cryptography Laboratory at the École normale supérieure. He is mainly known for his contributions in the area of provable security, including the Forking lemma, the Pointcheval-Stern signature algorithm, and his contributions to Password-authenticated key agreement.

== Biography ==
An alumnus of the École Normale Supérieure, David Pointcheval obtained his Ph.D. in 1996 from the University of Caen Normandy. In 1998, he joined the French National Centre for Scientific Research, working within the Computer Science department of École Normale Supérieure. Since then, his research has focused mostly on asymmetric cryptography and Provable security, of which he was one of the pioneers. He has authored more than 100 international publications, and co-invented a dozen patents. He was awarded a European Research Council Advanced Grant in 2015. In 2021 he received the RSA Award for Excellence in Mathematics.
