= Taher Elgamal =

American cryptographer

Taher A. Elgamal
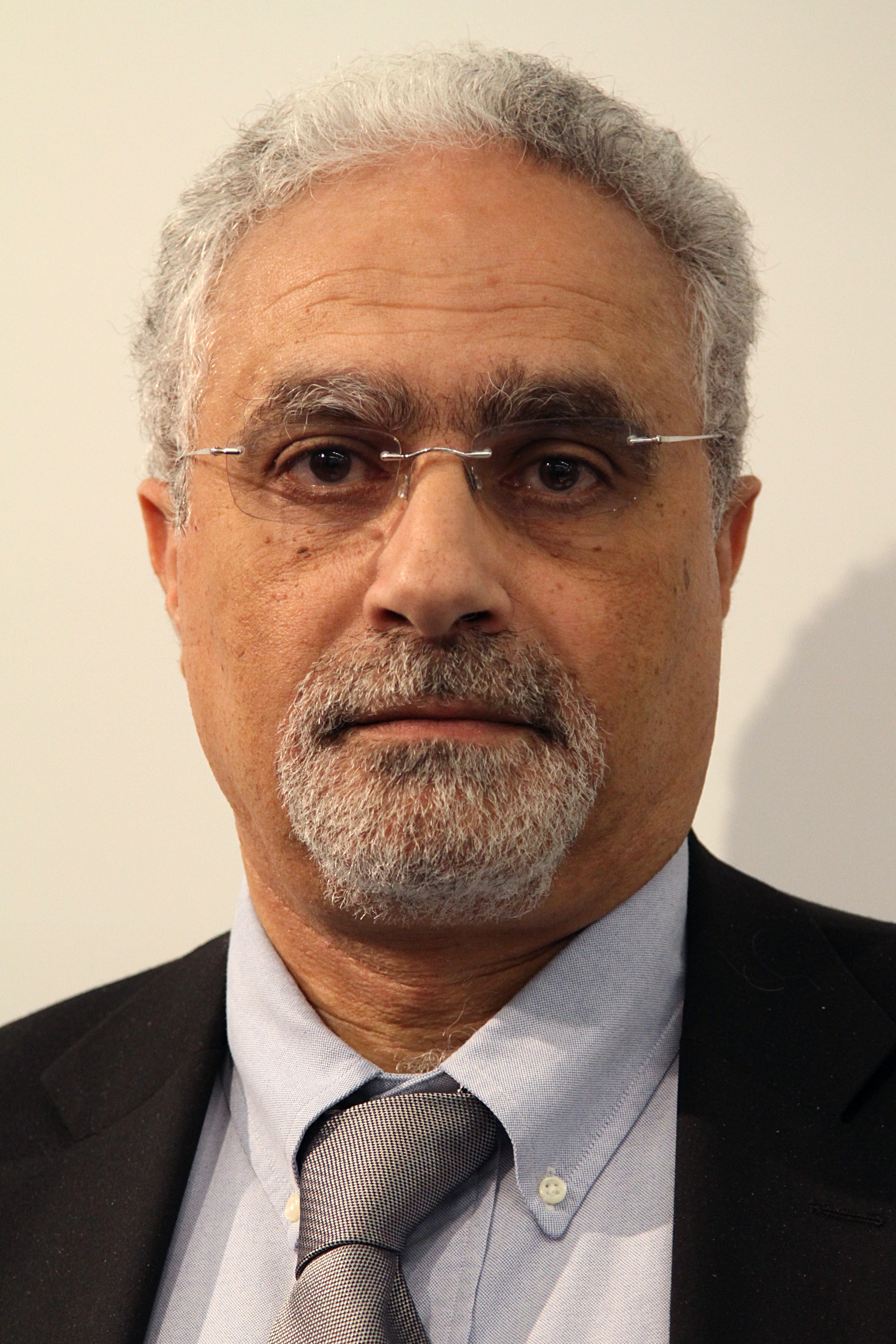
- Taher A. Elgamal (2010)
- Born: 18 August 1955 (age 71); Cairo, Egypt
- Education: Cairo University (BSc); Stanford University (MS, PhD)
- Known for: SSL; Public-key; ElGamal; Discrete logarithm cryptography
- Awards: RSA Conference Lifetime Achievement Award (2009); Marconi Prize (2019); National Academy of Engineering (2022); Kuwait Informatics Award (2025)
- Scientific career
- Fields: Cryptography
- Workplaces: Salesforce.com
- Doctoral advisor: Martin Hellman

Taher Elgamal (Note: The spellings El Gamal and ElGamal are also found in cryptographic literature. He himself spells it Elgamal (one word, singly capitalized), as it is less likely to be mangled in English.) (Arabic: طاهر الجمل) (born 18 August 1955) is an Egyptian-American cryptographer and tech executive. Since January 2023, he has been a partner at venture capital firm Evolution Equity Partners. Prior to that, he was the founder and CEO of Securify and the director of engineering at RSA Security. From 1995 to 1998, he was the chief scientist at Netscape Communications. From 2013 to 2023, he served as the Chief Technology Officer (CTO) of Security at Salesforce.

Elgamal's 1985 paper entitled "A Public Key Cryptosystem and A Signature Scheme Based on Discrete Logarithms" proposed the design of the ElGamal discrete log cryptosystem and of the ElGamal signature scheme. The latter scheme became the basis for Digital Signature Algorithm (DSA) adopted by National Institute of Standards and Technology (NIST) as the Digital Signature Standard (DSS). His development of the Secure Sockets Layer (SSL) cryptographic protocol at Netscape in the 1990s was also the basis for the Transport Layer Security (TLS) and HTTPS Internet protocols.

== Biography ==
=== Early life ===
Elgamal was born in Egypt. He earned a BSc in electrical engineering from Cairo University in 1977, and an MS and PhD in the same field from Stanford University in 1981 and 1984, respectively. Martin Hellman was his dissertation advisor.

=== Career ===
Elgamal joined the technical staff at HP Labs in 1984. He served as chief scientist at Netscape Communications from 1995 to 1998, where he was a driving force behind Secure Sockets Layer. Network World described him as the "father of SSL." SSL was the basis for the Transport Layer Security (TLS) and HTTPS Internet protocols.

He also was the director of engineering at RSA Security Inc. before founding Securify in 1998 and becoming its chief executive officer. According to an interview with Elgamal, when Securify was acquired by Kroll-O'Gara, he became the president of its information security group. After helping Securify spin out from Kroll-O'Gara, Taher served as the company's chief technology officer (CTO) from 2001 to 2004. In late 2008, Securify was acquired by Secure Computing and is now part of McAfee. In October 2006, he joined Tumbleweed Communications as a CTO. Tumbleweed was acquired in 2008 by Axway Inc. Until 2023, Elgamal was CTO for security at Salesforce.com. He now works as a partner at Evolution Equity Partners.

==== Entrepreneurial ventures ====
Elgamal is a co-founder of NokNok Labs and InfoSec Global. He serves as a director of Vindicia, Inc., which provides online payment services, Zix Corporation, which provides email encryption services, and Bay Dynamics. He has served as an adviser to Cyphort, Bitglass, Onset Ventures, Glenbrook Partners, PGP corporation, Arcot Systems, Finjan, Actiance, Symplified, and Zetta. He served as Chief Security Officer of Axway, Inc. He is vice chairman of SecureMisr.

==== Executive roles ====
Elgamal has also held executive roles at technology and security companies, including

- CTO of Security at Salesforce.com from 2013 to 2023,
- CSO at Axway, Inc. from 2008 to 2011,
- CTO at Tumbleweed Communications from 2006 to 2008,
- CTO at Securify, Inc. from 2001 to 2004,
- CEO and President of Securify, Inc. from 1998 to 2001 and,
- Chief Scientist of Netscape Communications from 1995 to 1998.

=== Recognition ===
- Elgamal is a recipient of the RSA Conference 2009 Lifetime Achievement Award, and he is recognized as the "father of SSL," the Internet security standard Secure Sockets Layer.
- Elgamal and Paul Kocher were jointly awarded the 2019 Marconi Prize for "their development of SSL/TLS and other contributions to the security of communications".
- Election to the National Academy of Engineering, 2022, for contributions to cryptography, e-commerce, and protocols for secure internet transactions.

== Publications ==
As a scholar, Elgamal published 4 articles:

- T. ElGamal, "A subexponential-time algorithm for computing discrete logarithms over GF(p^{2})", IEEE Trans. Inf. Theory, vol. 31, no. 4, pp. 473–481, 1985.
- T. Elgamal, "A public key cryptosystem and a signature scheme based on discrete logarithms", IEEE Trans. Inf. Theory, vol. 31, no. 4, pp. 469–472, Jul. 1985.
- T. ElGamal, "On Computing Logarithms Over Finite Fields", in Advances in Cryptology – CRYPTO ’85 Proceedings, 1986, pp. 396–402.
- T. Elgamal, "The new predicaments of security practitioners", Computer Fraud & Security, vol. 2009, no. 11, pp. 12–14, Nov. 2009.
