= Index of cryptography articles =

Articles related to cryptography include:

== A ==
A5/1 • A5/2 • ABA digital signature guidelines • ABC (stream cipher) • Abraham Sinkov • Acoustic cryptanalysis • Adaptive chosen-ciphertext attack • Adaptive chosen plaintext and chosen ciphertext attack • Advantage (cryptography) • ADFGVX cipher • Adi Shamir • Advanced Access Content System • Advanced Encryption Standard • Advanced Encryption Standard process • Adversary • AEAD block cipher modes of operation • Affine cipher • Agnes Meyer Driscoll • AKA (security) • Akelarre (cipher) • Alan Turing • Alastair Denniston • Al Bhed language • Alex Biryukov • Alfred Menezes • Algebraic Eraser • Algorithmically random sequence • Alice and Bob • All-or-nothing transform • Alphabetum Kaldeorum • Alternating step generator • American Cryptogram Association • AN/CYZ-10 • Anonymous publication • Anonymous remailer • Antoni Palluth • Anubis (cipher) • Argon2 • ARIA (cipher) • Arlington Hall • Arne Beurling • Arnold Cipher • Array controller based encryption • Arthur Scherbius • Arvid Gerhard Damm • Asiacrypt • Atbash • Attribute-based encryption • Attack model • Auguste Kerckhoffs • Authenticated encryption • Authentication • Authorization certificate • Autokey cipher • Avalanche effect

== B ==
B-Dienst • Babington Plot • Baby-step giant-step • Bacon's cipher • Banburismus • Bart Preneel • BaseKing • BassOmatic • BATON • BB84 • Beale ciphers • BEAR and LION ciphers • Beaufort cipher • Beaumanor Hall • Bent function • Berlekamp–Massey algorithm • Bernstein v. United States • BestCrypt • Biclique attack • BID/60 • BID 770 • Bifid cipher • Bill Weisband • Binary Goppa code • Biometric word list • Birthday attack • Bit-flipping attack • BitTorrent protocol encryption • Biuro Szyfrów • Black Chamber • Blaise de Vigenère • Bletchley Park • Blinding (cryptography) • Blind signature • Block cipher • Block cipher mode of operation • Block size (cryptography) • Blowfish (cipher) • Blum Blum Shub • Blum–Goldwasser cryptosystem • Bomba (cryptography) • Bombe • Book cipher • Books on cryptography • Boomerang attack • Boris Hagelin • Bouncy Castle (cryptography) • Broadcast encryption • Bruce Schneier • Brute-force attack • Brute Force: Cracking the Data Encryption Standard • Burrows–Abadi–Needham logic • Burt Kaliski

== C ==
C2Net • C-36 (cipher machine) • C-52 (cipher machine) • Caesar cipher • Camellia (cipher) • CAPICOM • Capstone (cryptography) • Cardan grille • Card catalog (cryptology) • Carlisle Adams • CAST-128 • CAST-256 • Cayley–Purser algorithm • CBC-MAC • CCM mode • CCMP • CD-57 • CDMF • Cellular Message Encryption Algorithm • Centiban • Central Security Service • Centre for Applied Cryptographic Research • Central Bureau • Certicom • Certificate authority • Certificate-based encryption • Certificateless cryptography • Certificate revocation list • Certificate signing request • Certification path validation algorithm • Chaffing and winnowing • Challenge-Handshake Authentication Protocol • Challenge–response authentication • Chosen-ciphertext attack • Chosen-plaintext attack • CIKS-1 • Cipher disk • Cipher runes • Cipher security summary • CipherSaber • Ciphertext expansion • Ciphertext indistinguishability • Ciphertext-only attack • Ciphertext stealing • CIPHERUNICORN-A • CIPHERUNICORN-E • Classical cipher • Claude Shannon • Claw-free permutation • Cleartext • CLEFIA • Clifford Cocks • Clipper chip • Clock (cryptography) • Clock drift • CMVP • COCONUT98 • Codebook • Code (cryptography) • Code talker • Codress message • Cold boot attack • Collision attack • Collision resistance • Colossus computer • Combined Cipher Machine • Commitment scheme • Common Scrambling Algorithm • Communications security • Communications Security Establishment • Communication Theory of Secrecy Systems • Comparison of disk encryption software • Comparison of SSH clients • Completeness (cryptography) • Complexity trap • Computational Diffie–Hellman assumption • Computational hardness assumption • Computer insecurity • Computer and network surveillance • COMSEC equipment • Conch (SSH) • Concrete security • Conel Hugh O'Donel Alexander • Confidentiality • Confusion and diffusion • Content Scramble System • Controlled Cryptographic Item • Corkscrew (program) • Correlation immunity • COSIC • Covert channel • Cover (telecommunications) • Crab (cipher) • Cramer–Shoup cryptosystem • CRAM-MD5 • CRHF • Crib (cryptanalysis) • Crowds (anonymity network) • Crypt (C) • Cryptanalysis • Cryptanalysis of the Enigma • Cryptanalysis of the Lorenz cipher • Cryptanalytic computer • Cryptex • Cryptico • Crypto AG • Crypto-anarchism • Crypto API (Linux) • Microsoft CryptoAPI • CryptoBuddy • Cryptochannel • CRYPTO (conference) • Cryptogram • Cryptographically Generated Address • Cryptographically secure pseudorandom number generator • Cryptographically strong • Cryptographic Application Programming Interface • Cryptographic hash function • Cryptographic key types • Cryptographic Message Syntax • Cryptographic primitive • Cryptographic protocol • Cryptographic Service Provider • Cryptographie indéchiffrable • Cryptography • Cryptography in Japan • Cryptography newsgroups • Cryptography standards • Crypto: How the Code Rebels Beat the Government—Saving Privacy in the Digital Age • Cryptologia • Cryptology ePrint Archive • Cryptology Research Society of India • Cryptomathic • Cryptome • Cryptomeria cipher • Cryptonomicon • CrypTool • Crypto-society • Cryptosystem • Cryptovirology • CRYPTREC • CS-Cipher • Curve25519 • Cycles per byte • Cyclometer • Cypherpunk • Cyrillic Projector

== D ==
D'Agapeyeff cipher • Daniel J. Bernstein • Data Authentication Algorithm • Data Encryption Standard • Datagram Transport Layer Security • David Chaum • David Kahn • David Naccache • David Wagner • David Wheeler (computer scientist) • Davies attack • Davies–Meyer hash • DEAL • Decipherment • Decisional Diffie–Hellman assumption • Decorrelation theory • Decrypt • DeCSS • Defence Signals Directorate • Degree of anonymity • Delegated Path Discovery • Delegated Path Validation • Deniable encryption • Derek Taunt • Derived unique key per transaction • DES Challenges • DES supplementary material • DES-X • Deterministic encryption • DFC (cipher) • Dictionary attack • Differential cryptanalysis • Differential-linear attack • Differential power analysis • Diffie–Hellman key exchange • Diffie–Hellman problem • DigiCipher 2 • Digital Fortress • Digital rights management • Digital signature • Digital Signature Algorithm • Digital signature forgery • Digital timestamping • Digital watermarking • Dilly Knox • Dining cryptographers problem • Diplomatic bag • Direct Anonymous Attestation • Discrete logarithm • Disk encryption • Disk encryption hardware • Disk encryption software • Distance-bounding protocol • Distinguishing attack • Distributed.net • DMA attack • dm-crypt • Dmitry Sklyarov • DomainKeys • Don Coppersmith • Dorabella Cipher • Double Ratchet Algorithm • Doug Stinson • Dragon (cipher) • DRYAD • Dual_EC_DRBG

== E ==
E0 (cipher) • E2 (cipher) • E4M • EAP-AKA • EAP-SIM • EAX mode • ECC patents • ECHELON • ECRYPT • Edouard Fleissner von Wostrowitz • Edward Hebern • Edward Scheidt • Edward Travis • EFF DES cracker • Efficient Probabilistic Public-Key Encryption Scheme • EKMS • Electronic Communications Act 2000 • Electronic money • Electronic signature • Electronic voting • ElGamal encryption • ElGamal signature scheme • Eli Biham • Elizebeth Friedman • Elliptic-curve cryptography • Elliptic-curve Diffie–Hellman • Elliptic Curve DSA • Elonka Dunin • Encrypted function • Encrypted key exchange • Encrypting File System • Encryption • Encryption software • Enigmail • Enigma machine • Enigma rotor details • Entrust • Ernst Fetterlein • eSTREAM • Étienne Bazeries • Eurocrypt • EuroCrypt • Export of cryptography • Extensible Authentication Protocol

== F ==
Fast Software Encryption • Fast syndrome-based hash • FEA-M • FEAL • Feige–Fiat–Shamir identification scheme • Feistel cipher • Félix Delastelle • Fialka • Filesystem-level encryption • FileVault • Fill device • Financial cryptography • FIPS 140 • FIPS 140-2 • Firefly (key exchange protocol) • FISH (cipher) • Fish (cryptography) • Floradora • Fluhrer, Mantin and Shamir attack • Format-preserving encryption • Fortezza • Fort George G. Meade • Fortuna (PRNG) • Four-square cipher • Franciszek Pokorny • Frank A. Stevenson • Frank Rowlett • Freenet • FreeOTFE • FreeS/WAN • Frequency analysis • Friedrich Kasiski • Fritz-chip • FROG • FROSTBURG • FTP over SSH • Full disk encryption • Full Domain Hash • F. W. Winterbotham

== G ==
Galois/Counter Mode • Gardening (cryptanalysis) • GCHQ Bude • GCHQ CSO Morwenstow • GDES • Generic Security Services Application Program Interface • George Blakley • George Scovell • GGH encryption scheme • GGH signature scheme • Gilbert Vernam • GMR (cryptography) • GNU Privacy Guard • GnuTLS • Goldwasser–Micali cryptosystem • Gordon Welchman • GOST (block cipher) • GOST (hash function) • Government Communications Headquarters • Government Communications Security Bureau • Grain (cipher) • Grand Cru (cipher) • Great Cipher • Grill (cryptology) • Grille (cryptography) • Group-based cryptography • Group signature • Grover's algorithm • Gustave Bertrand • Gwido Langer

== H ==
H.235 • HAIFA construction • HAIPE • Hans Dobbertin • Hans-Thilo Schmidt • Hard-core predicate • Hardware random number generator • Hardware security module • Harold Keen • Harry Hinsley • Harvest (computer) • HAS-160 • Hash-based cryptography • Hashcash • Hash chain • Hash function security summary • Hash list • Hasty Pudding cipher • HAVAL • HC-256 • HC-9 • Heath Robinson (codebreaking machine) • Hebern rotor machine • Henri Braquenié • Henryk Zygalski • Herbert Yardley • Hidden Field Equations • Hideki Imai • Hierocrypt • High-bandwidth Digital Content Protection • Higher-order differential cryptanalysis • Hill cipher • History of cryptography • HMAC • HMAC-based One-time Password algorithm (HOTP) • Horst Feistel • Howard Heys • Https • Hugo Hadwiger • Hugo Koch • Hushmail • Hut 6 • Hut 8 • HX-63 • Hybrid cryptosystem • Hyperelliptic curve cryptography • Hyper-encryption

== I ==
Ian Goldberg • IBM 4758 • ICE (cipher) • ID-based cryptography • IDEA NXT • Identification friend or foe • IEEE 802.11i • IEEE P1363 • I. J. Good • Illegal prime • Impossible differential cryptanalysis • Index of coincidence • Indifferent chosen-ciphertext attack • Indistinguishability obfuscation • Information leakage • Information Security Group • Information-theoretic security • Initialization vector • Integer factorization • Integral cryptanalysis • Integrated Encryption Scheme • Integrated Windows Authentication • Interlock protocol • Intermediate certificate authorities • International Association for Cryptologic Research • International Data Encryption Algorithm • Internet Key Exchange • Internet Security Association and Key Management Protocol • Interpolation attack • Invisible ink • IPsec • Iraqi block cipher • ISAAC (cipher) • ISO 19092-2 • ISO/IEC 9797 • Ivan Damgård

== J ==
Jacques Stern (cryptographer) • JADE (cypher machine) • James Gillogly • James H. Ellis • James Massey • Jan Graliński • Jan Kowalewski • Japanese naval codes • Java Cryptography Architecture • Jefferson disk • Jennifer Seberry • Jerzy Różycki • Joan Daemen • Johannes Trithemius • John Herivel • John Kelsey (cryptanalyst) • John R. F. Jeffreys • John Tiltman • Jon Lech Johansen • Josef Pieprzyk • Joseph Desch • Joseph Finnegan (cryptographer) • Joseph Mauborgne • Joseph Rochefort • Journal of Cryptology • Junger v. Daley

== K ==
Kaisa Nyberg • Kalyna (cipher) • Kasiski examination • KASUMI • KCDSA • KeePass • Kerberos (protocol) • Kerckhoffs's principle • Kevin McCurley (cryptographer) • Key-agreement protocol • Key authentication • Key clustering • Key (cryptography) • Key derivation function • Key distribution center • Key escrow • Key exchange • Keyfile • Key generation • Key generator • Key management • Key-recovery attack • Key schedule • Key server (cryptographic) • Key signature (cryptography) • Keysigning • Key signing party • Key size • Key space (cryptography) • Keystream • Key stretching • Key whitening • KG-84 • KHAZAD • Khufu and Khafre • Kiss (cryptanalysis) • KL-43 • KL-51 • KL-7 • Kleptography • KN-Cipher • Knapsack problem • Known-key distinguishing attack • Known-plaintext attack • KOI-18 • KOV-14 • Kryha • Kryptos • KSD-64 • Kupyna • Kuznyechik • KW-26 • KW-37 • KY-3 • KY-58 • KY-68 • KYK-13

== L ==
Lacida • Ladder-DES • Lamport signature • Lars Knudsen • Lattice-based cryptography • Laurance Safford • Lawrie Brown • LCS35 • Leo Marks • Leonard Adleman • Leon Battista Alberti • Leo Rosen • Leslie Yoxall • LEVIATHAN (cipher) • LEX (cipher) • Linear cryptanalysis • Linear-feedback shift register • Link encryption • List of ciphertexts • List of cryptographers • List of cryptographic file systems • List of cryptographic key types • List of telecommunications encryption terms • List of people associated with Bletchley Park • List of SFTP clients • List of SFTP server software • LOKI • LOKI97 • Lorenz cipher • Louis W. Tordella • Lsh • Lucifer (cipher) • Lyra2

== M ==
M6 (cipher) • M8 (cipher) • M-209 • M-325 • M-94 • MacGuffin (cipher) • Madryga • MAGENTA • Magic (cryptography) • Maksymilian Ciężki • Malcolm J. Williamson • Malleability (cryptography) • Man-in-the-middle attack • Marian Rejewski • MARS (cryptography) • Martin Hellman • MaruTukku • Massey–Omura cryptosystem • Matt Blaze • Matt Robshaw • Max Newman • McEliece cryptosystem • mcrypt • MD2 (cryptography) • MD4 • MD5 • MD5CRK • MDC-2 • MDS matrix • Mean shortest distance • Meet-in-the-middle attack • Mental poker • Mercury (cipher machine) • Mercy (cipher) • Meredith Gardner • Merkle signature scheme • Merkle–Damgård construction • Merkle–Hellman knapsack cryptosystem • Merkle's Puzzles • Merkle tree • MESH (cipher) • Message authentication • Message authentication code • Message forgery • MI8 • Michael Luby • MICKEY • Microdot • Military Cryptanalysis (book) (William F. Friedman) • Military Cryptanalytics • Mimic function • Mirror writing • MISTY1 • Mitsuru Matsui • MMB (cipher) • Mod n cryptanalysis • MQV • MS-CHAP • MUGI • MULTI-S01 • MultiSwap • Multivariate cryptography

== N ==
National Communications Centre • National Cryptologic Museum • National Security Agency • National Cipher Challenge • Navajo I • Neal Koblitz • Needham–Schroeder protocol • Negligible function • NEMA (machine) • NESSIE • Network Security Services • Neural cryptography • New Data Seal • NewDES • N-Hash • Nicolas Courtois • Niederreiter cryptosystem • Niels Ferguson • Nigel de Grey • Nihilist cipher • Nikita Borisov • Nimbus (cipher) • NIST hash function competition • Nonlinear-feedback shift register • NOEKEON • Non-malleable codes • Noreen • Nothing up my sleeve number • NSA cryptography • NSA encryption systems • NSAKEY • NSA Suite A Cryptography • NSA Suite B Cryptography • NT LAN Manager • NTLMSSP • NTRUEncrypt • NTRUSign • Null cipher • Numbers station • NUSH • NTRU

== O ==
Oblivious transfer • OCB mode • Oded Goldreich • Off-the-Record Messaging • Okamoto–Uchiyama cryptosystem • OMI cryptograph • OMNI (SCIP) • One-key MAC • One-time pad • One-time password • One-way compression function • One-way function • Onion routing • Online Certificate Status Protocol • OP-20-G • OpenPGP card • OpenSSH • OpenSSL • Openswan • OpenVPN • Operation Ruthless • Optimal asymmetric encryption padding • Over the Air Rekeying (OTAR) • OTFE • Otway–Rees protocol

== P ==
Padding (cryptography) • Padding oracle attack • Paillier cryptosystem • Pairing-based cryptography • Panama (cryptography) • Partitioning cryptanalysis • Passive attack • Passphrase • Password • Password-authenticated key agreement • Password cracking • Password Hashing Competition • Paul Kocher • Paulo Pancatuccio • Paulo S. L. M. Barreto • Paul van Oorschot • PBKDF2 • PC Bruno • Pepper (cryptography) • Perfect forward secrecy • Perforated sheets • Permutation cipher • Peter Gutmann (computer scientist) • Peter Junger • Peter Twinn • PGP Corporation • PGPDisk • PGPfone • Phelix • Phil Zimmermann • Photuris (protocol) • Physical security • Physical unclonable function • Pig Latin • Pigpen cipher • Pike (cipher) • Piling-up lemma • Pinwheel (cryptography) • Piotr Smoleński • Pirate decryption • PKC (conference) • PKCS • PKCS 11 • PKCS 12 • PKIX • Plaintext • Plaintext-aware encryption • Playfair cipher • Plugboard • PMAC (cryptography) • Poem code • Pohlig–Hellman algorithm • Point-to-Point Tunneling Protocol • Pointcheval–Stern signature algorithm • Poly1305 • Polyalphabetic cipher • Polybius square • Post-quantum cryptography • Post-Quantum Cryptography Standardization • Power analysis • Preimage attack • Pre-shared key • Pretty Good Privacy • Printer steganography • Privacy-enhanced Electronic Mail • Private Communications Technology • Private information retrieval • Probabilistic encryption • Product cipher • Proof-of-work system • Protected Extensible Authentication Protocol • Provable security • Provably secure cryptographic hash function • Proxy re-encryption • Pseudo-Hadamard transform • Pseudonymity • Pseudorandom function • Pseudorandom number generator • Pseudorandom permutation • Public key certificate • Public-key cryptography • Public key fingerprint • Public key infrastructure • PURPLE • PuTTY • Py (cipher)

== Q ==
Q (cipher) • Qrpff • QUAD (cipher) • Quadratic sieve • Quantum coin flipping • Quantum cryptography • Quantum digital signature • Quantum fingerprinting • Quantum key distribution

== R ==
Rabbit (cipher) • Rabin cryptosystem • Rabin signature • RadioGatún • Rail fence cipher • Rainbow table • Ralph Merkle • Rambutan (cryptography) • Random function • Randomness tests • Random number generator attack • Random oracle • RC2 • RC4 • RC5 • RC6 • Rebound attack • Reciprocal cipher • Red/black concept • REDOC • Red Pike (cipher) • Reflector (cipher machine) • Regulation of Investigatory Powers Act 2000 • Reihenschieber • Rekeying (cryptography) • Related-key attack • Replay attack • Reservehandverfahren • Residual block termination • Rijndael key schedule • Rijndael S-box • Ring signature • RIPEMD • Rip van Winkle cipher • Robert Morris (cryptographer) • Rockex • Rolf Noskwith • Ron Rivest • Room 40 • Root certificate • Ross J. Anderson • Rossignols • ROT13 • Rotor machine • RSA RSA • RSA-100 • RSA-1024 • RSA-110 • RSA-120 • RSA-129 • RSA-130 • RSA-140 • RSA-150 • RSA-1536 • RSA-155 • RSA-160 • RSA-170 • RSA-180 • RSA-190 • RSA-200 • RSA-2048 • RSA-210 • RSA-220 • RSA-230 • RSA-232 • RSA-240 • RSA-250 • RSA-260 • RSA-270 • RSA-280 • RSA-290 • RSA-300 • RSA-309 • RSA-310 • RSA-320 • RSA-330 • RSA-340 • RSA-350 • RSA-360 • RSA-370 • RSA-380 • RSA-390 • RSA-400 • RSA-410 • RSA-420 • RSA-430 • RSA-440 • RSA-450 • RSA-460 • RSA-470 • RSA-480 • RSA-490 • RSA-500 • RSA-576 • RSA-617 • RSA-640 • RSA-704 • RSA-768 • RSA-896 • RSA-PSS • RSA Factoring Challenge • RSA problem • RSA Secret-Key Challenge • RSA Security • Rubber-hose cryptanalysis • Running key cipher • Russian copulation

== S ==
S-1 block cipher • SAFER • Salsa20 • Salt (cryptography) • SAM card • Security Support Provider Interface • SAML • SAVILLE • SC2000 • Schnorr group • Schnorr signature • Schoof–Elkies–Atkin algorithm • SCIP • Scott Vanstone • Scrambler • Scramdisk • Scream (cipher) • Scrypt • Scytale • Seahorse (software) • SEAL (cipher) • Sean Murphy (cryptographer) • SECG • Secret broadcast • Secret decoder ring • Secrets and Lies (Schneier) • Secret sharing • Sectéra Secure Module • Secure access module • Secure channel • Secure Communication based on Quantum Cryptography • Secure copy • Secure cryptoprocessor • Secure Electronic Transaction • Secure Hash Algorithms • Secure Hypertext Transfer Protocol • Secure key issuing cryptography • Secure multi-party computation • Secure Neighbor Discovery • Secure Real-time Transport Protocol • Secure remote password protocol • Secure Shell • Secure telephone • Secure Terminal Equipment • Secure voice • SecurID • Security association • Security engineering • Security level • Security parameter • Security protocol notation • Security through obscurity • Security token • SEED • Selected Areas in Cryptography • Self-certifying File System • Self-shrinking generator • Self-signed certificate • Semantic security • Serge Vaudenay • Serpent (cipher) • Session key • SHACAL • Shafi Goldwasser • SHA-1 • SHA-2 • SHA-3 • Shared secret • SHARK • Shaun Wylie • Shor's algorithm • Shrinking generator • Shugborough inscription • Side-channel attack • Siemens and Halske T52 • SIGABA • SIGCUM • SIGINT • Signal Protocol • Signal Intelligence Service • Signcryption • SIGSALY • SILC (protocol) • Silvio Micali • Simple Authentication and Security Layer • Simple public-key infrastructure • Simple XOR cipher • S/KEY • Skein (hash function) • Skipjack (cipher) • Slide attack • Slidex • Small subgroup confinement attack • S/MIME • SM4 algorithm (formerly SMS4) • Snake oil (cryptography) • Snefru • SNOW • Snuffle • SOBER-128 • Solitaire (cipher) • Solomon Kullback • SOSEMANUK • Special Collection Service • Spectr-H64 • SPEKE (cryptography) • Sponge function • SPNEGO • Square (cipher) • Ssh-agent • SSLeay • Stafford Tavares • Standard model (cryptography) • Station CAST • Station HYPO • Station-to-Station protocol • Statistical cryptanalysis • Stefan Lucks • Steganalysis • Steganography • Straddling checkerboard • Stream cipher • Stream cipher attacks • Strong cryptography • Strong RSA assumption • Stuart Milner-Barry • STU-II • STU-III • Stunnel • Substitution box • Substitution cipher • Substitution–permutation network • Superencryption • Supersingular isogeny key exchange • Swedish National Defence Radio Establishment • SWIFFT • SXAL/MBAL • Symmetric-key algorithm • SYSKEY

== T ==
Tabula recta • Taher Elgamal • Tamper resistance • Tcpcrypt • Television encryption • TEMPEST • Template:Cryptographic software • Temporal Key Integrity Protocol • Testery • Thawte • The Alphabet Cipher • The Code Book • The Codebreakers • The Gold-Bug • The Magic Words are Squeamish Ossifrage • Theory of Cryptography Conference • The world wonders • Thomas Jakobsen • Three-pass protocol • Threshold shadow scheme • TICOM • Tiger (cryptography) • Timeline of cryptography • Time/memory/data tradeoff attack • Time-based One-time Password algorithm (TOTP) • Timing attack • Tiny Encryption Algorithm • Tom Berson • Tommy Flowers • Topics in cryptography • Tor (anonymity network) • Torus-based cryptography • Traffic analysis • Traffic-flow security • Traitor tracing • Transmission security • Transport Layer Security • Transposition cipher • Trapdoor function • Trench code • Treyfer • Trifid cipher • Triple DES • Trivium (cipher) • TrueCrypt • Truncated differential cryptanalysis • Trusted third party • Turing (cipher) • TWINKLE • TWIRL • Twofish • Two-square cipher • Type 1 encryption • Type 2 encryption • Type 3 encryption • Type 4 encryption • Typex

== U ==
UES (cipher) • Ultra (cryptography) • UMAC • Unbalanced Oil and Vinegar • Undeniable signature • Unicity distance • Universal composability • Universal one-way hash function (UOWHF)

== V ==
Venona project • Verifiable secret sharing • Verisign • Very smooth hash • VEST • VIC cipher • VideoCrypt • Vigenère cipher • Vincent Rijmen • VINSON • Virtual private network • Visual cryptography • Voynich manuscript

== W ==
Wadsworth's cipher • WAKE • WLAN Authentication and Privacy Infrastructure • Watermark (data file) • Watermarking attack • Weak key • Web of trust • Whirlpool (hash function) • Whitfield Diffie • Wide Mouth Frog protocol • Wi-Fi Protected Access • William F. Friedman • William Montgomery (cryptographer) • WinSCP • Wired Equivalent Privacy • Wireless Transport Layer Security • Witness-indistinguishable proof • Workshop on Cryptographic Hardware and Embedded Systems • World War I cryptography • World War II cryptography • W. T. Tutte

== X ==
X.509 • XDH assumption • Xiaoyun Wang • XML Encryption • XML Signature • xmx • XSL attack • XTEA • XTR • Xuejia Lai • XXTEA 10-00-00-00-00

== Y ==
Yarrow algorithm • Y-stations • Yuliang Zheng

== Z ==
Zeroisation • Zero-knowledge password proof • Zero-knowledge proof • Zfone • Zodiac (cipher) • ZRTP • Zimmermann–Sassaman key-signing protocol • Zimmermann Telegram

== See also ==
- Outline of cryptography – an analytical list of articles and terms.
- Books on cryptography – an annotated list of suggested readings.
- List of cryptographers – an annotated list of cryptographers.
- WikiProject Cryptography – discussion and resources for editing cryptography articles.
