= Cobra ciphers =

Cryptographic cipher

In cryptography, Cobra is the general name of a family of data-dependent permutation based block ciphers: Cobra-S128, Cobra-F64a, Cobra-F64b, Cobra-H64, and Cobra-H128. In each of these names, the number indicates the cipher's block size, and the capital letter indicates whether it is optimized for implementation in software, firmware, or hardware.

== See also ==
- CIKS-1
- Spectr-H64
