= Thames Bridge =

Thames Bridge may refer to

- Thames Bridge, the official name of the A34 Road Bridge at Oxford, England
- M4 Thames Bridge, a bridge at Maidenhead, England
- Thames River Bridge (Amtrak), a bridge in Connecticut
- Thames Bridge (cryptography), a classified United Kingdom government cipher

== See also ==
- Crossings of the River Thames
