= Cryptography newsgroups =

Newsgroup relevant to the discussion of cryptography and related issues

There are several newsgroups relevant for discussions about cryptography and related issues.

- sci.crypt — an unmoderated forum for discussions on technical aspects of cryptography.
- sci.crypt.research — a similar, moderated group, focusing on research into cryptography. It was founded based on a charter by Peter Gutmann.
- sci.crypt.random-numbers — discuss generation of cryptographically secure random numbers.
- talk.politics.crypto — discussions of the relationship between cryptography and government. The original charter was by D.J. Silverton.
- alt.security.pgp — discussion of Pretty Good Privacy (PGP) and related software.

== sci.crypt ==
In 1995, Bruce Schneier commented, "It is read by an estimated 100,000 people worldwide. Most of the posts are nonsense, bickering, or both; some are political, and most of the rest are requests for information or basic questions. Occasionally nuggets of new and useful information are posted to this newsgroup."

Leaked descriptions of secret algorithms have been posted to the Internet via sci.crypt, for example RC2, RC4 and Khufu and Khafre. Others have been hoaxes: Iraqi block cipher and S-1, the latter an alleged description of the (then-secret) Skipjack cipher. The group is also the origin of the term, "Rubber-hose cryptanalysis".
