= QDS (disambiguation) =

QDS may refer to

- the Semitic triliteral Q-D-Š "sacred"
- Quantum digital signature
- a medical abbreviation for 'every six hours,' from Latin: quater die sumendus.
