= H64 =

H64 may refer to:

- Spectr-H64, a 2001 block cipher
- HMS Duchess (H64)
- HMS Beverley (H64), a ship of the Royal Navy which saw service during World War II
