= UES (cipher) =

Block cipher

General
- Designers: Helena Handschuh, Serge Vaudenay
- First published: 1999
- Derived from: DEAL, Triple DES

Cipher detail
- Key sizes: 128, 192, or 256 bits
- Block sizes: 128 bits
- Structure: Feistel network
- Rounds: 48 DES-equivalent rounds

In cryptography, UES (Universal Encryption Standard) is a block cipher designed in 1999 by Helena Handschuh and Serge Vaudenay. They proposed it as a transitional step, to prepare for the completion of the AES process.

UES was designed with the same interface as AES: a block size of 128 bits and key size of 128, 192, or 256 bits. It consists of two parallel Triple DES encryptions on the halves of the block, with key whitening and key-dependent swapping of bits between the halves. The key schedule is taken from DEAL.

== See also ==
- Data Encryption Standard
