= Red Pike =

Red Pike may refer to:

- Red Pike (Buttermere), a summit near Buttermere in the English Lake District
- Red Pike (cipher), a United Kingdom government cipher
- Red Pike (Wasdale), a summit near Wasdale in the English Lake District
