= Mercy (cipher) =

Block cipher

General
- Designers: Paul Crowley
- First published: April 2000
- Derived from: WAKE

Cipher detail
- Key sizes: 128 bits
- Block sizes: 4096 bits
- Structure: Feistel network
- Rounds: 6

Best public cryptanalysis
- Scott Fluhrer's differential attack breaks the cipher.

In cryptography, Mercy is a tweakable block cipher designed by Paul Crowley for disk encryption.

The block size is 4096 bits—unusually large for a block cipher, but a standard disk sector size. Mercy uses a 128-bit secret key, along with a 128-bit non-secret tweak for each block. In disk encryption, the sector number would be used as a tweak. Mercy uses a 6-round Feistel network structure with partial key whitening. The round function uses a key-dependent state machine which borrows some structure from the stream cipher WAKE, with key-dependent S-boxes based on the Nyberg S-boxes also used in AES.

Scott Fluhrer has discovered a differential attack that works against the full 6 rounds of Mercy. This attack can even be extended to a seven-round variant.
