= CRSI =

CRSI or CrSi may refer to:

- Calorie Restriction Society International
- Chemical Research Society of India
- Community Refugee Sponsorship Initiative, a joint project by Refugee Council of Australia and other organisations
- Concrete Reinforcing Steel Institute
- Cryptology Research Society of India
- Chromium monosilicide, a chemical compound with a formula CrSi
