= Topic =

Topic, topics, TOPIC, topical, or topicality may refer to:

== Topic / Topics ==
- Topić, a Slavic surname
- Topics (Aristotle), a work by Aristotle
- Topic (chocolate bar), a brand of confectionery bar
- Topic (DJ), German musician
- Topic (linguistics), the information motivating a sentence or clause's structure
- Topic: The Washington & Jefferson College Review, an academic journal
- Topic Records, a British record label
- In topic-based authoring, a topic is a discrete piece of content that is about a specific subject, has an identifiable purpose, and can stand alone
- Topic Studios, a production organization and streaming video service run by First Look Media

== TOPIC ==
- TOPIC, an Internet Relay Chat (IRC) command setting a channel's title
- BID 770, a British cipher machine codenamed "TOPIC"

== Topical ==
- Topical medication, medication applied to bodily surfaces

== Topicality ==
- Topicality (policy debate), a stock issue in policy debate

== See also ==
- On-topic
- Subject (disambiguation)
