= Jim K. Omura =

Jimmy K. Omura (born September 8, 1940 in San Jose, California) was an electrical engineer and information theorist.

Omura received his B.S. and M.S. from MIT, and his Ph.D. from Stanford University, all in electrical engineering. He was a professor of electrical engineering at UCLA for 15 years. His notable work includes the design of a number of spread spectrum communications systems, and the Massey-Omura cryptosystem (with James Massey). With Andrew Viterbi he co-authored Principles of Digital Communication and Coding (ISBN 0070675163), a standard textbook in digital communications. He also co-authored the Spread Spectrum Communications Handbook (ISBN 0071382151).

Omura and Dave Forney independently realized that the Viterbi decoder was optimal and that it could be applied to intersymbol interference, not just binary convolutional codes as originally described. According to his friend and colleague Martin Hellman, Omura told him that once you understood dynamic programming, the optimality of Viterbi decoding followed immediately. And the intersymbol interference result derived from the fact that that phenomenon is just a convolutional code over the reals instead of over GF(2).

In 1981, Jim K. Omura was elevated to the grade of IEEE fellow for contribution to information and communications theory as applied to communications systems design.

Omura founded the data security company Cylink, which had an IPO in 1996 and was acquired by SafeNet in 2003. He was the technology strategist for the Gordon and Betty Moore Foundation during 2002 - 2011.

In 2005, Omura received the IEEE Alexander Graham Bell Medal. He was elected a member of the National Academy of Engineering in 1997 for contributions in spread-spectrum communications and data encryption. He was inducted into the Silicon Valley Engineering Hall of Fame in 2009.

Omura died August 29, 2024 in San Francisco, California.

Awards
Preceded by Not awarded (Joachim Hagenauer, 2003)	IEEE Alexander Graham Bell Medal; 2005	Succeeded by John Wozencraft
