= Topić =

Topić (Serbian Cyrillic: Топић) is a Bosnian, Croatian and Serbian surname that may refer to the following notable people:

- Ante Topić Mimara (1898–1987), Croatian art collector and philanthropist
- Angelina Topić (born 2005), Serbian high jumper
- Biljana Topić (born 1977), Serbian triple jumper
- Borislav Topić (born 1984), Bosnian football defender
- Dado Topić (born 1949), Croatian rock musician
- Dragutin Topić (born 1971), Serbian high jumper
- Eldar Topić (born 1983), Bosnian football player
- Goran Topić (born 1967), Serbian basketball coach and scout
- Jadranko Topić (born 1949), Yugoslav football striker
- Jan Topić (born 1983), Ecuadorian businessman and politician
- Josip Topić (born 1982), Bosnian-Herzegovinian football player
- Joško Topić (born 1983), Croatian tennis player
- Milenko Topić (born 1969), Serbian basketball coach and former player
- Marko Topić (born 1976), Bosnian football forward
- Mira Topić (born 1983), Croatian volleyball player
- Mirko Topić (born 2001), Serbian football player
- Nikola Topić (born 2005), Serbian basketball player
- Ognjen Topic (born 1986), Serbian-born American Muay Thai kickboxer
- Velibor Topić (born 1970), Bosnian and British actor
- Željko Topić (born 1959), Croatian civil servant
- Topic (DJ) (born 1992), German DJ, producer and musician

== See also ==
- Topic (disambiguation)
