= National Cipher Challenge =

The National Cipher Challenge is an annual cryptographic competition organised by the University of Southampton School of Mathematics. Competitors attempt to break cryptograms published on the competition website. In 2017, more than 7,500 students took part in the competition. Participants must be in full-time school level education in order to qualify for prizes.

== Format ==
The competition is organised into eight to ten challenges, which are further subdivided into parts A and B. The part A challenge consists of a comparatively simpler cryptogram, and usually provides some useful information to assist in the solving of part B. Part B is usually more complex. In later challenges the cryptograms become harder to break. In the past, part A cryptograms have been encrypted with the Caesar cipher, the Affine cipher, the Keyword cipher, the Transposition cipher, the Vigenère cipher and the 2x2 Hill cipher.

The part B challenges are intended to be harder. These begin with relatively simple substitution ciphers, including the Bacon cipher and Polybius square, before moving on to transposition ciphers, Playfair ciphers and polyalphabetic ciphers such as the Vigenère cipher, the Autokey cipher and the Alberti cipher. In the later stages of the competition, the ADFGVX cipher, the Solitaire cipher, the Double Playfair cipher, the Hill cipher, the Book cipher and versions of the Enigma and Fialka cipher machines have all been used. The 2009 challenge ended with a Jefferson Disk cipher, the 2012 challenge ended with the ADFGVX Cipher, the 2014 with the Playfair Cipher, and the 2024 challenge ended with a sectioned Cadenus transposition.

== Prizes ==
£25 cash prizes are awarded to eight random entrants who submit a correct solution for each part A of the challenge. Leaderboards for the part B challenges are also compiled, based on how accurate solutions are and how quickly the entrant broke the cipher. Prizes are awarded to the top three entrants at the end of the challenge. In the 2009/10 challenge, the sponsors provided several prizes: IBM provided iPod Touches to each member of the team winning the Team Prize, Trinity College provided a cash prize of £700, and GCHQ provided a cash prize of £1000. In previous years prizes such as an IBM Thinkpad laptop have been awarded.

After the challenge the winners of the top prizes and other randomly selected entrants are invited to a day held at Bletchley Park consisting of lectures (with subjects such as the Semantic Web, World War II cryptography and computer programming) and the prize-giving ceremony. Guests such as Rob Eastaway have been invited in the past.

Current sponsors of the competition include GCHQ, IBM, British Computer Society, Trinity College, Cambridge, Cambridge University Press, Winton Capital Management and EPSRC.
