= Michael Wood (cryptographer) =

American cryptographer

Michael Wood is an American cryptographer who designed the REDOC encryption system. He is also the author of The Jesus Secret and other books.
