= SXAL/MBAL =

Block cipher

SXAL
General
- Designers: Laurel Intelligent Systems
- First published: December 1993

Cipher detail
- Key sizes: 64 bits
- Block sizes: 64 bits
- Structure: Substitution–permutation network
- Rounds: 8

Best public cryptanalysis

In cryptography, SXAL (substitution xor algorithm, sometimes called SXAL8) is a block cipher designed in 1993 by Yokohama-based Laurel Intelligent Systems. It is normally used in a special mode of operation called MBAL (multi-block algorithm). SXAL/MBAL has been used for encryption in a number of Japanese PC cards and smart cards.

SXAL is an 8-round substitution–permutation network with block size and key size of 64 bits each. All operations are byte-oriented. The algorithm uses a single 8×8-bit S-box K, designed so that both K(X) and X XOR K(X) are injective functions. In each round, the bytes of the block are first permuted. Then each byte is XORed with a key byte and an earlier ciphertext byte, processed through the S-box, and XORed with the previous plaintext byte.

The key schedule is rather complex, processing the key with SXAL itself, beginning with a null key and using permuted intermediate results as later keys.

== MBAL ==
MBAL is an encryption algorithm built using SXAL that can be applied to messages any number of bytes in length (at least 8). It uses two 64-bit extended keys for key whitening on the first 64 bits. The algorithm consists of 9 steps:

1. Pre-whitening
2. F_{m}: An expanded version of SXAL applied to the entire message
3. SXAL the block consisting of the first 4 and last 4 bytes
4. Reverse the byte order of the entire message
5. F_{m}
6. Reverse
7. SXAL the ends
8. F_{m}
9. Post-whitening

MBAL has been shown to be susceptible to both differential cryptanalysis and linear cryptanalysis.
