= Ladder-DES =

Block cipher

General
- Designers: Terry Ritter
- First published: February 22, 1994
- Derived from: DES
- Related to: DEAL

Cipher detail
- Key sizes: 224 bits
- Block sizes: 128 bits
- Structure: Nested Feistel network
- Rounds: 4

Best public cryptanalysis
- Eli Biham's attacks require 2^{36} plaintext-ciphertext pairs and 2^{90} work

In cryptography, Ladder-DES is a block cipher designed in 1994 by Terry Ritter. It is a 4-round Feistel cipher with a block size of 128 bits, using DES as the round function. It has no actual key schedule, so the total key size is 4×56=224 bits.

In 1997, Eli Biham found two forms of cryptanalysis for Ladder-DES that depend on the birthday paradox; the key is deduced from the presence or absence of collisions, plaintexts that give equal intermediate values in the encryption process. He presented both a chosen-plaintext attack and a known-plaintext attack; each uses about 2^{36} plaintexts and 2^{90} work, but the known-plaintext attack requires much more memory.
