= Three-pass protocol =

Cryptography framework

In cryptography, a three-pass protocol for sending messages is a framework which allows one party to securely send a message to a second party without the need to exchange or distribute encryption keys. Such message protocols should not be confused with various other algorithms which use 3 passes for authentication.

It is called a three-pass protocol because the sender and the receiver exchange three encrypted messages. The first three-pass protocol was developed by Adi Shamir circa 1980, and is described in more detail in a later section. The basic concept of the three-pass protocol is that each party has a private encryption key and a private decryption key. The two parties use their keys independently, first to encrypt the message, and then to decrypt the message.

The protocol uses an encryption function E and a decryption function D. The encryption function uses an encryption key e to change a plaintext message m into an encrypted message, or ciphertext, $E(e,m)$. Corresponding to each encryption key e there is a decryption key d which allows the message to be recovered using the decryption function, $D(d,E(e,m)) = m$. Sometimes the encryption function and decryption function are the same.

In order for the encryption function and decryption function to be suitable for the three-pass protocol they must have the property that for any message m, any encryption key e with corresponding decryption key d and any independent encryption key k, $D(d,E(k,E(e,m))) = E(k,m)$. In other words, it must be possible to remove the first encryption with the key e even though a second encryption with the key k has been performed. This will always be possible with a commutative encryption. A commutative encryption is an encryption that is order-independent, i.e. it satisfies $E(a,E(b,m)) = E(b,E(a,m))$ for all encryption keys a and b and all messages m. Commutative encryptions satisfy $D(d,E(k,E(e,m))) = D(d,E(e,E(k,m)))$.

The three-pass protocol works as follows:

1. The sender chooses a private encryption key s and a corresponding decryption key t. The sender encrypts the message m with the key s and sends the encrypted message $E(s,m)$ to the receiver.
2. The receiver chooses a private encryption key r and a corresponding decryption key q and super-encrypts the first message $E(s,m)$ with the key r and sends the doubly encrypted message $E(r,E(s,m))$ back to the sender.
3. The sender decrypts the second message with the key t. Because of the commutativity property described above $D(t,E(r,E(s,m))) = E(r,m)$ which is the message encrypted with only the receiver's private key. The sender sends this to the receiver.

The receiver can now decrypt the message using the key q, namely $D(q,E(r,m)) = m$ the original message.

Notice that all of the operations involving the sender's private keys s and t are performed by the sender, and all of the operations involving the receiver's private keys r and q are performed by the receiver, so that neither party needs to know the other party's keys.

== Shamir three-pass protocol ==
The first three-pass protocol was the Shamir three-pass protocol developed circa in 1980. It is also called the Shamir No-Key Protocol because the sender and the receiver do not exchange any keys, however the protocol requires the sender and receiver to have two private keys for encrypting and decrypting messages. The Shamir algorithm uses exponentiation modulo a large prime as both the encryption and decryption functions. That is E(e,m) = m^{e} mod p and D(d,m) = m^{d} mod p where p is a large prime. For any encryption exponent e in the range 1..p-1 with gcd(e,p-1) = 1. The corresponding decryption exponent d is chosen such that de ≡ 1 (mod p-1). It follows from Fermat's Little Theorem that D(d,E(e,m)) = m^{de} mod p = m.

The Shamir protocol has the desired commutativity property since E(a,E(b,m)) = m^{ab} mod p = m^{ba} mod p = E(b,E(a,m)).

== Massey–Omura cryptosystem ==
The Massey–Omura Cryptosystem was proposed by James Massey and Jim K. Omura in 1982 as a possible improvement over the Shamir protocol. The Massey–Omura method uses exponentiation in the Galois field GF(2^{n}) as both the encryption and decryption functions. That is E(e,m)=m^{e} and D(d,m)=m^{d} where the calculations are carried out in the Galois field. For any encryption exponent e with 0<e<2^{n}-1 and gcd(e,2^{n}-1)=1 the corresponding decryption exponent is d such that de ≡ 1 (mod 2^{n}-1). Since the multiplicative group of the Galois field GF(2^{n}) has order 2^{n}-1 Lagrange's theorem implies that m^{de}=m for all m in GF(2^{n})^{*} .

Each element of the Galois field GF(2^{n}) is represented as a binary vector over a normal basis in which each basis vector is the square of the preceding one. That is, the basis vectors are v^{1}, v^{2}, v^{4}, v^{8}, ... where v is a field element of maximum order. By using this representation, exponentiations by powers of 2 can be accomplished by cyclic shifts. This means that raising m to an arbitrary power can be accomplished with at most n shifts and n multiplications. Moreover, several multiplications can be performed in parallel. This allows faster hardware realizations at the cost of having to implement several multipliers.

== Security ==
A necessary condition for a three-pass algorithm to be secure is that an attacker cannot determine any information about the message m from the three transmitted messages $E(s,m)$, $E(r,E(s,m))$ and $E(r,m)$.

For the encryption functions used in the Shamir algorithm and the Massey–Omura algorithm described above, the security relies on the difficulty of computing discrete logarithms in a finite field. If an attacker could compute discrete logarithms in GF(p) for the Shamir method or GF(2^{n}) for the Massey–Omura method then the protocol could be broken. The key s could be computed from the messages m^{r} and m^{rs}. When s is known, it is easy to compute the decryption exponent t. Then the attacker could compute m by raising the intercepted message m^{s} to the t power. K. Sakurai and H. Shizuya show that under certain assumptions breaking Massey–Omura cryptosystem is equivalent to the Diffie–Hellman assumption.

== Authentication ==
The three-pass protocol as described above does not provide any authentication. Hence, without any additional authentication the protocol is susceptible to a man-in-the-middle attack if the opponent has the ability to create false messages, or to intercept and replace the genuine transmitted messages.
