= HC-9 =

Mechanical cipher device

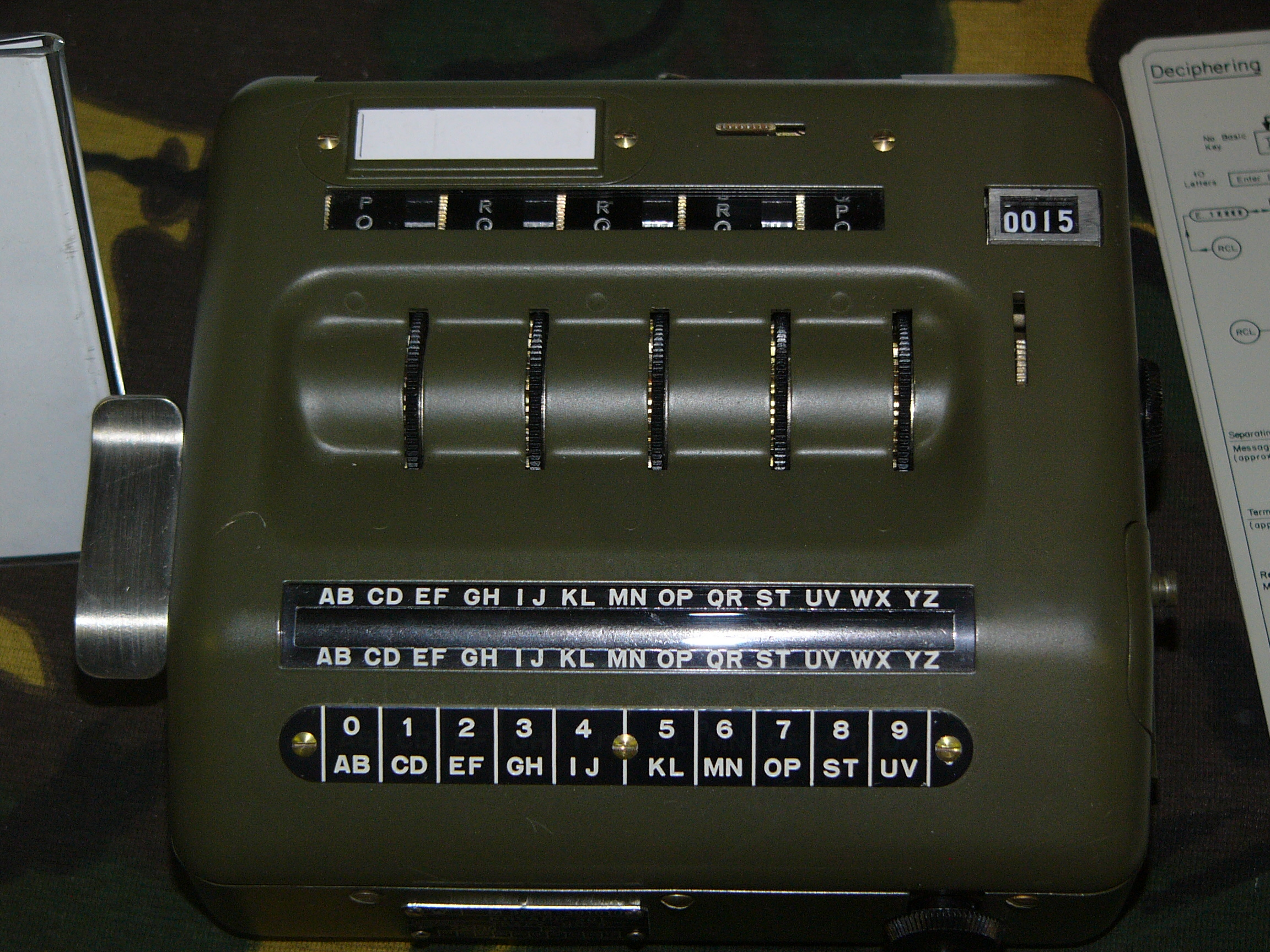
An HC-9 on display at Bletchley Park.

The HC-9 was a mechanical cipher device manufactured by the Swedish company AB Transvertex. It was designed in the early 1950s for the Swedish Armed Forces and in use from 1963 to 1995 as Krypteringsapparat 301 (Kryapp 301). This machine was used for low-level communications such as platoon, company, up to battalion levels and in regimental and brigade staffs.The machine dimensions are 18 x 15 x 7 cm.

== Operation ==
The HC-9 made use of punched cards instead of the pin-wheel mechanisms of other machines (for example, the Hagelin M-209).
