= LEVIATHAN (cipher) =

Stream cipher

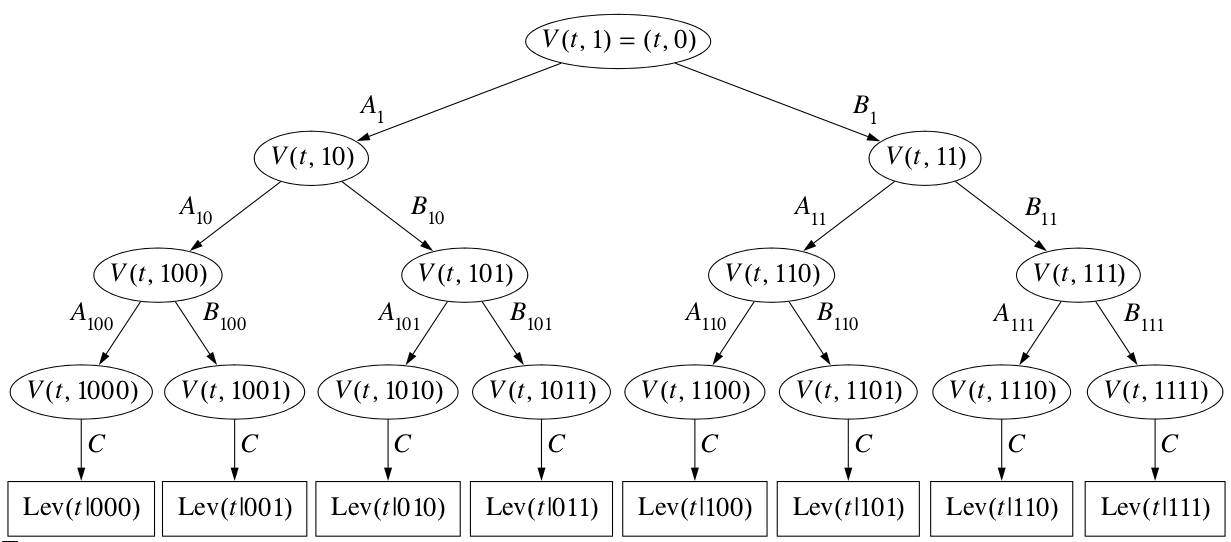
LEVIATHAN's tree-based keystream generation

LEVIATHAN is a stream cipher submitted to NESSIE by Scott Fluhrer and David McGrew. It is a seekable stream cipher, which means that the user may efficiently skip forward to any part of the keystream, much like CTR mode or Salsa20, but unlike those ciphers generating contiguous blocks of the keystream is made especially efficient by LEVIATHAN's unique tree structure based stream generation. LEVIATHAN achieves around 11 cycles per byte on a Pentium II processor.

LEVIATHAN is considered broken due to distinguishing attacks which require 2^{36} bytes of output and comparable effort.
