= Quantum fingerprinting =

Quantum fingerprinting is a proposed technique that uses a quantum computer to generate a string with a similar function to the cryptographic hash function. Alice and Bob hold $n$-bit strings $x$ and $y$. Their goal and a referee's is to obtain the correct value of
$$f(x,y) = \begin{cases}
1 & \text{if } x = y, \\
0 & \text{if } x \neq y. \\
\end{cases}$$
. To do this, $2^{n}$ quantum states are produced from the O(logn)-qubit state fingerprints and sent to the referee who performs the Swap test to detect if the fingerprints are similar or different with a high probability.

If unconditional guarantees of security are needed, and if it is impractical for the communicating parties to arrange to share a secret that can be used in a Carter–Wegman MAC, this technique might one day be faster than classical techniques given a quantum computer with 5 to 10 qubits. However, these circumstances are very unusual and it is unlikely the technique will ever have a practical application; it is largely of theoretical interest.

== See also ==
- Quantum cryptography
- Quantum digital signature
- Swap test
