= Cryptochannel =

System of crypto-communications

In telecommunications, a cryptochannel is a complete system of crypto-communications between two or more holders or parties. It includes: (a) the cryptographic aids prescribed; (b) the holders thereof; (c) the indicators or other means of identification; (d) the area or areas in which effective; (e) the special purpose, if any, for which provided; and (f) pertinent notes as to distribution, usage, etc. A cryptochannel is analogous to a radio circuit.

== See also ==
- Cryptosystem
- Secure channel
