= Paulo Pancatuccio =

Italian cryptographer

Paulo Pancatuccio was a 16th-century cryptographer born in Volterra and employed by the Pope to break enciphered documents. His activities are described in Blaise de Vigenère's book on cryptography.
