= Rambutan (cryptography) =

Rambutan is a cryptographic chip for confidential communication for the UK government

Rambutan is a family of encryption technologies designed by the Communications-Electronics Security Group (CESG), the technical division of the United Kingdom government's secret communications agency, GCHQ.

It includes a range of encryption products designed by CESG for use in handling confidential (not secret) communications between parts of the British government, government agencies, and related bodies such as NHS Trusts. Unlike CESG's Red Pike system, Rambutan is not available as software: it is distributed only as a self-contained electronic device (an ASIC) which implements the entire cryptosystem and handles the related key distribution and storage tasks. Rambutan is not sold outside the government sector.

Technical details of the Rambutan algorithm are secret. Security researcher Bruce Schneier describes it as being a stream cipher (linear-feedback shift register) based cryptosystem with 5 shift registers each of around 80 bits, and a key size of 112 bits. RAMBUTAN-I communications chips (which implement a secure X.25 based communications system) are made by approved contractors Racal and Baltimore Technologies/Zergo Ltd. CESG later specified RAMBUTAN-II, an enhanced system with backward compatibility with existing RAMBUTAN-I infrastructure. The RAMBUTAN-II chip is a 64-pin quad ceramic pack chip, which implements the electronic codebook, cipher block chaining, and output feedback operating modes (each in 64 bits) and the cipher feedback mode in 1 or 8 bits. Schneier suggests that these modes may indicate Rambutan is a block cipher rather than a stream. The three 64 bit modes operate at 88 megabits/second. Rambutan operates in three modes: ECB, CBC, and 8 bit CFB.
