= Codress message =

In military cryptography, a codress message is an encrypted message whose address is also encrypted. This is usually done to prevent traffic analysis.
