= CryptoBuddy =

Computer file encryption software

CryptoBuddy is a simple software application for the encryption and compression of computer files to make them safe and secure.

== Overview ==
The application uses a 64-bit block cipher algorithm for encryption and a proprietary compression algorithm. The CryptoBuddy software is also used as part of the CryptoStick encryption device from Research Triangle Software, Inc.

== Release ==
The software was released for public use on June 12, 2002.
