= Secure access module =

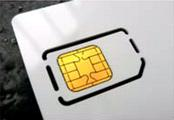
A secure access module

A Secure Access Module (SAM), also known as a Secure Application Module, is a piece of cryptographic hardware typically used by smart card card readers to perform mutual key authentication. SAMs can be used to manage access in a variety of contexts, such as public transport fare collection and point of sale devices.

== Formats ==
- Removable SAM: This form factor resembles a standard Subscriber Identification Module (SIM) card. It plugs into a dedicated SAM slot within the smart card reader.
- Embedded SAM: This form factor integrates the SAM functionality directly onto the printed circuit board (PCB) of the reader system. The SAM component is typically housed within a secure enclosure soldered onto the PCB.

== Components ==
A typical smart card reader system generally consists of the following key components:

- Microcontroller (MCU): This acts as the central processing unit (CPU) of the reader system. It manages various tasks such as protocol handling, data flow control, and data interpretation.
- Reader Integrated Circuit (Reader IC): This specialized chip facilitates communication between the SAM and the contactless smart card using radio frequency (RF) interface protocols.

== Integration and functionality ==
By integrating a SAM into the reader system, the security functionalities are centralized and offloaded from the MCU. The SAM assumes responsibility for:

- Key Management: Secure storage and management of cryptographic keys, including master keys and application keys derived from them.
- Cryptography: Performing various cryptographic operations such as encryption, decryption, and digital signing to ensure data confidentiality and integrity.
- Mutual Authentication: Facilitating a two-way authentication process between the smart card and the reader system to verify the legitimacy of both parties before allowing any communication to proceed.
- Secure Messaging: Enabling secure communication between the SAM and the host system by encrypting and authenticating data packets.

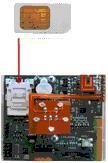
SAM in a HVQFN housing

SAMs can be deployed in any of the following applications:

- Generate application keys based on master keys
- Store and secure master keys
- Perform cryptographic functions with smart cards
- Use as a secure encryption device
- Perform mutual authentication
- Generate session keys
- Perform secure messaging
