= Reihenschieber =

German cipher system

The Reihenschieber (English: Row Slider) was a hand cipher system used by the German Bundeswehr. It was developed during 1957 and used until the early 1960s, although information about the system was released publicly only in 1992. The system was used to encrypt high-grade messages.

The device consists of a frame on which a set of "rods" are clipped: plastic square sticks containing a sequence of digits (0–9) and dots on each face. 10 rods are used, chosen out of a set of 26.

The Reihenschieber generated a stream of pseudo-random digits. These digits are then used to navigate through a number of printed tables to create a polyalphabetic cipher.
