= Key clustering =

Key or hash function should avoid clustering, the mapping of two or more keys to consecutive slots. Such clustering may cause the lookup cost to skyrocket, even if the load factor is low and collisions are infrequent. The popular multiplicative hash is claimed to have particularly poor clustering behaviour.
