= KL-43 =

Electronic cipher device

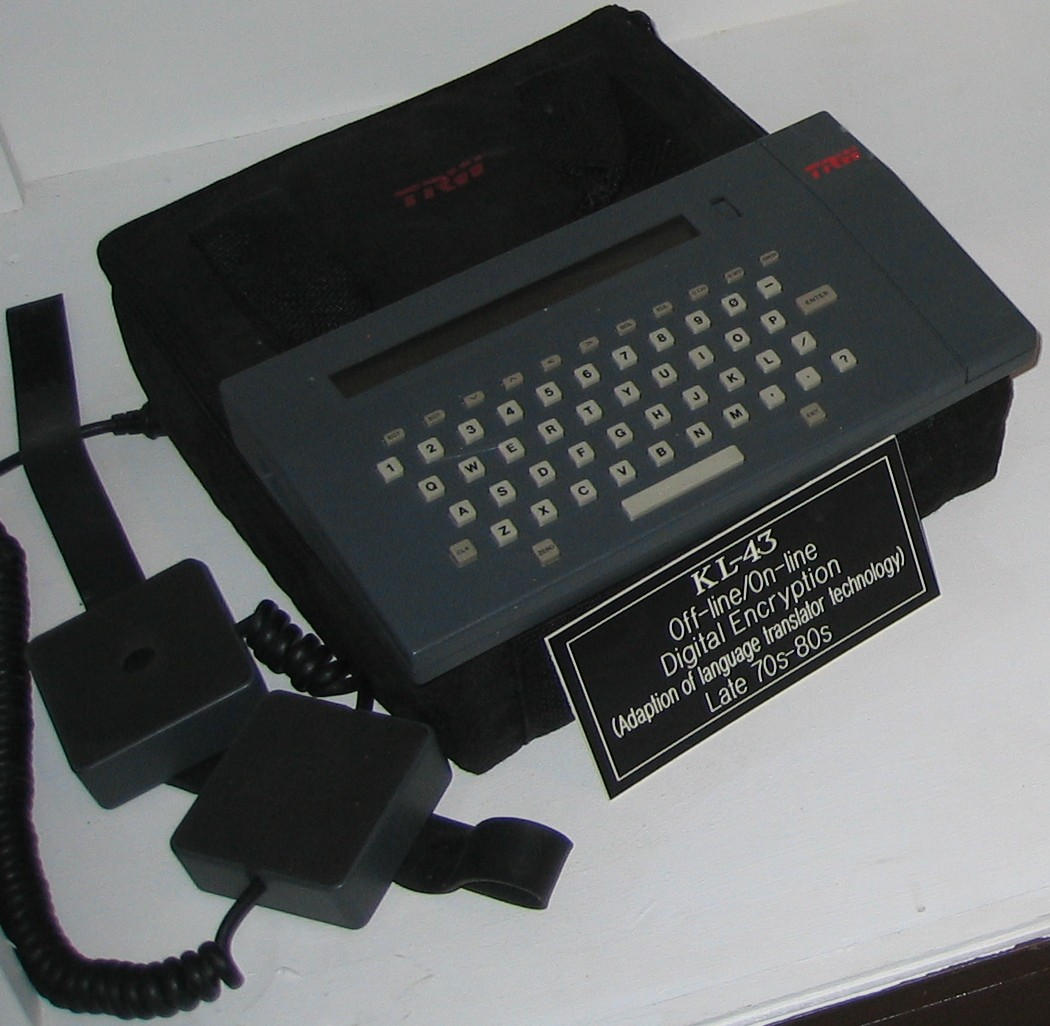
A KL-43 on display at the National Cryptologic Museum.

The KL-43 is a portable, electronic cipher device used by the United States and the NATO from the early 1980s. The machine, manufactured by TRW, is an adaptation of language translator technology, and includes a keyboard for input and an LCD for output. It also contains a built-in modem, a telephone coupler, and the facility for connecting to a printer. A version of the KL-43 was famously used by Oliver North to communicate with his assistant, Fawn Hall, and others while managing clandestine operations in Nicaragua in support of the "Contra" rebels. The device was paraded in front of cameras during the Iran-Contra congressional hearings.

There are a number of variations of the KL-43, including the following:

- KL-43A - early model.
- KL-43C - a tactical rugged version from the 1980s.
- KL-43D - mid-production and most common version with small keyboard (original cost ca. US$300).
- KL-43E - full-size keyboard model for high volume office operations (original cost below US$1000).
- KL-43F - most recent tactical version for wired and wireless networks made by EPI.
