= FEA-M =

Block cipher

General
- Designers: X. Yi, C.H. Tan, C.K. Siew, and M.R. Syed
- First published: 2001

Cipher detail
- Key sizes: about 4094.2 bits
- Block sizes: 4096 bits
- Rounds: 1

Best public cryptanalysis
- Youssef and Tavares break it with 1 known plaintext and 2 chosen plaintexts

In cryptography, FEA-M (Fast Encryption Algorithm for Multimedia) is a block cipher developed in 2001 by X. Yi, C. H. Tan, C. K. Siew, and M. R. Syed.

With the unusually large block size of 4096 bits, all of FEA-M's calculations operate on 64×64 binary matrices. Unlike most block ciphers, FEA-M does not use multiple rounds of encryption. Each block is encrypted using just two multiplications and two additions. The data is encrypted using a pair of session keys chosen for just that message. The key is an invertible matrix used to encrypt the session keys, and the encrypted session keys must be sent along with the ciphertext. Since only invertible matrices can be used for the key, the effective key size is about 4094.2 bits.

FEA-M is insecure; an attack found by Youssef and Tavares (2003) recovers the secret key using only 1 known plaintext and 2 chosen plaintexts.
