= HAS-160 =

Cryptographic hash function

HAS-160 is a cryptographic hash function designed for use with the Korean KCDSA digital signature algorithm. It is derived from SHA-1, with assorted changes intended to increase its security. It produces a 160-bit output.

HAS-160 is used in the same way as SHA-1. First it divides input in blocks of 512 bits each and pads the final block. A digest function updates the intermediate hash value by processing the input blocks in turn.

The message digest algorithm consists of 80 rounds.
