= Key generator =

Algorithm used in cryptographic protocols

A key generator is a protocol or algorithm that is used in many cryptographic protocols to generate a sequence with many pseudo-random characteristics. This sequence is used as an encryption key at one end of communication, and as a decryption key at the other. One can implement a key generator in a system that aims to generate, distribute, and authenticate keys in a way that without the private key, one cannot access the information in the public end.

Examples of key generators include linear-feedback shift registers (LFSR) and the Solitaire (or Pontifex) cipher.
