= Private Communications Technology =

Private Communications Technology (PCT) 1.0 was a protocol developed by Microsoft in the mid-1990s. PCT was designed to address security flaws in version 2.0 of Netscape's Secure Sockets Layer protocol and to force Netscape to hand control of the then-proprietary SSL protocol to an open standards body.

PCT has since been superseded by SSLv3 and Transport Layer Security. For a while it was still supported by Internet Explorer, but PCT 1.0 has been disabled by default since IE 5 and the option was removed in IE6. It was found in IIS and in the Windows operating system libraries until Windows XP, although in Windows Server 2003 it was disabled by default. Since Windows Vista and Windows Server 2008 it is no longer available. It is used by old versions of MSMQ as the only choice.

Due to its near disuse, it is arguably a security risk, as it has received less attention in testing than commonly used protocols, and there is little incentive for Microsoft to expend effort on maintaining its implementation of it.
