= Secure channel =

Means of data transmission that is resistant to overhearing

In cryptography, a secure channel is a means of data transmission that is resistant to overhearing and tampering. A confidential channel is a means of data transmission that is resistant to overhearing, or eavesdropping (e.g., reading the content), but not necessarily resistant to tampering (i.e., manipulating the content). An authentic channel is a means of data transmission that is resistant to tampering but not necessarily resistant to overhearing.

In contrast to a secure channel, an insecure channel is unencrypted and may be subject to eavesdropping and tampering. Secure communications are possible over an insecure channel if the content to be communicated is encrypted prior to transmission.

== Secure channels in the real world ==
In practice, there are no perfectly secure channels. Instead, risk mitigation strategies are used to increase the security of vulnerable insecure channels (e.g., couriers, homing pigeons, diplomatic bags, etc.). Examples include padlocks (between courier wrists and a briefcase), loyalty tests, security investigations, providing armed security, and diplomatic immunity.

In 1976, two researchers proposed a key exchange technique (now named after them)—Diffie–Hellman key exchange (D-H). This protocol allows two parties to generate a key only known to them, under the assumption that a certain mathematical problem (e.g., the Diffie–Hellman problem in their proposal) is computationally infeasible (i.e., very hard) to solve, and that the two parties have access to an authentic channel. In short, an eavesdropper—conventionally termed 'Eve', who can listen to all messages exchanged by the two parties, but who can not modify the messages—will not learn the exchanged key. Such a key exchange was impossible with any previously known cryptographic schemes based on symmetric ciphers, because with these schemes it is necessary that the two parties exchange a secret key at some prior time, hence they require a confidential channel at that time which is just what we are attempting to build.

Most cryptographic techniques are trivially breakable if keys are not exchanged securely or, if they actually were so exchanged, those keys become known in some other way—burglary or extortion, for instance. A truly secure channel will not be required if an insecure channel can be used to securely exchange keys, and if burglary, bribery, or threat aren't used. The primary issue remains: how to know when an insecure channel worked securely, and if not, how to know whether anyone has actually been bribed or threatened. These are hard problems in the real world and no solutions are known, only expedients, jury rigs, and workarounds.

== Future possibilities ==
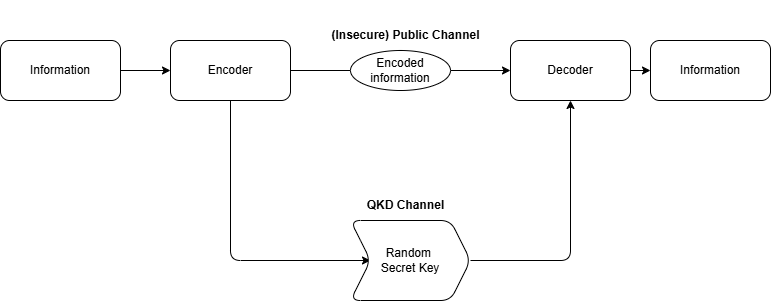
Explains how a random secret key is generated using QKD to encode information securely

Researchers have proposed and demonstrated quantum cryptography in order to create a secure channel. Quantum Key Distribution (QKD) establishes mathematically provable secure channels, but due to signal noise the technique hard to reproduce for now, limiting it to very special purpose applications. The best known protocols are BB84 and E91.

While implementations of classical cryptographic algorithms have received worldwide scrutiny over the years, only a limited amount of public research has been done to assess security of the present-day implementations of quantum cryptosystems, mostly because they are not in widespread use as of 2014.

== Modeling a secure channel ==
Security definitions for a secure channel aim to model its properties independently from its concrete instantiation. These properties are studied within provable security and are relevant to the design of secure channels and to evaluating their use in cryptographic protocols. A definition of a secure channel that remains secure, even when used in arbitrary cryptographic protocols is an important building block for universally composable cryptography.

A universally composable authenticated channel can be built using digital signatures and a public key infrastructure.

Universally composable confidential channels are known to exist under computational hardness assumptions based on hybrid encryption and a public key infrastructure.

== See also ==
- Cryptochannel
- Hybrid encryption
- Secure communication
