= CIKS-1 =

Block cipher

General
- Designers: A.A. Moldovyan and N.A. Moldovyan
- First published: January 2002
- Derived from: Spectr-H64

Cipher detail
- Key sizes: 256 bits
- Block sizes: 64 bits
- Structure: Feistel-like network
- Rounds: 8

Best public cryptanalysis
- Differential attack using 2^{56} chosen plaintexts

In cryptography, CIKS-1 is a block cipher designed in 2002 by A.A. Moldovyan and N.A. Moldovyan. Like its predecessor, Spectr-H64, it relies heavily on permutations of bits, so is better suited to implementation in hardware than in software.

The algorithm has a block size of 64 bits. It uses an 8 round structure in which half of the block determines the transformation of the other half in each round, similar to a Feistel cipher or RC5. In each round the key also undergoes a transformation dependent on the data. CIKS-1 uses four types of operations: data-dependent permutations, fixed permutations, XORs, and addition mod 4.

The designers of CIKS-1 didn't specify any key schedule for the cipher, but it uses a total key size of 256 bits. Kidney, Heys, and Norvell showed that round keys of low Hamming weight are relatively weak, so keys should be chosen carefully. The same researchers have also proposed a differential cryptanalysis of CIKS-1 which uses 2^{56} chosen plaintexts.
