= Cryptology Research Society of India =

Indian organisation supporting cryptography research

- Cryptology Research Society of India
- Abbreviation: CRSI
- Formation: 2001; 25 years ago
- Purpose: Supporting research in cryptography in India
- Region served: India
- Website: https://crsind.in

Cryptology Research Society of India (CRSI) is a scientific organisation that supports research in India on cryptography, data security, and related fields. The organisation was founded in 2001. CRSI organises workshops and conferences about cryptology.

== Activities ==
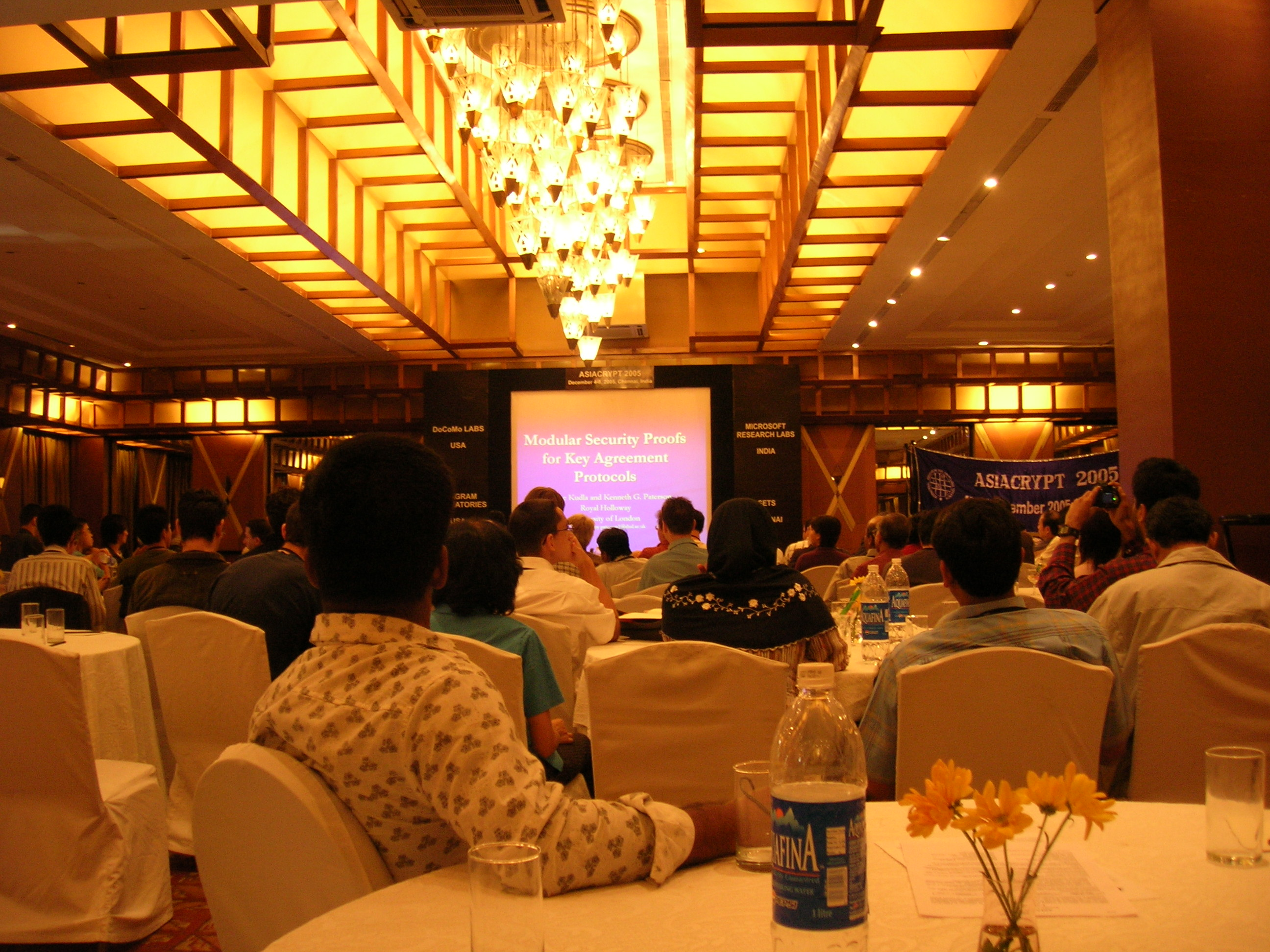
Asiacrypt 2005 organised by CRSI associating with IITM in Taj hotel, Chennai.

CRSI organises several annual workshops and conferences about cryptology. More specifically, CRSI organises the annual events INDOCRYPT, an international conference on cryptography, and the Indian national workshop on cryptology. It also arranged the International Association for Cryptologic Research's (IACR) workshop on Fast Software Encryption in 2003 at New Delhi and IACR's conference Asiacrypt in 2013 and in 2005 at Chennai.

In 2024, CRSI hosted ASIACRYPT 2024 in Kolkata from December 9 to 13, followed by the ASK 2024 workshop at TCG CREST, Kolkata, from December 14 to 17.

In 2025, CRSI held the International Conference on Cryptology in India (INDOCRYPT 2025) at the International Institute of Information Technology, Bhubaneswar on December 15.

== Organizational structure ==
The main office of CRSI is located in Kolkata. CRSI was founded by the current general secretary Prof. Bimal Roy, former Director of the Indian Statistical Institute. Padmashree R. Balasubramaniam, Director of IMSc, is the organization's president.
