= S-1 block cipher =

Cipher

In cryptography, the S-1 block cipher was a block cipher posted in source code form on Usenet on 11 August 1995. Although incorrect security markings immediately indicated a hoax, there were several features of the code which suggested it might be leaked source code for the Skipjack cipher, which was still classified at the time.

However once David Wagner had discovered a severe design flaw, involving the key schedule but not the underlying round function, it was generally accepted as being a hoax—but one with an astonishing amount of work behind it. Bruce Schneier noted that S-1 contained a feature never seen before in the open literature; a G-table that results in key and data dependent rotation of S-boxes to use in a given round. When Skipjack was eventually declassified in 1998, it was indeed found to be totally unlike S-1.

== See also ==
- Iraqi block cipher
