= WAKE (cipher) =

Stream cipher

In cryptography, WAKE is a stream cipher designed by David Wheeler in 1993.

WAKE stands for Word Auto Key Encryption. The cipher works in cipher feedback mode, generating keystream blocks from previous ciphertext blocks. WAKE uses an S-box with 256 entries of 32-bit words.

The cipher is fast, but vulnerable to chosen plaintext and chosen ciphertext attacks.

== Characteristics and vulnerability ==
WAKE is noted for its speed, making it suitable for applications requiring fast encryption. However, it has been found to be vulnerable to both chosen plaintext and chosen ciphertext attacks. These vulnerabilities arise from the cipher's reliance on previous ciphertext blocks for keystream generation, which can be exploited in certain attack scenarios.

Research has indicated that WAKE's design allows for effective chosen plaintext attacks, where an attacker can choose arbitrary plaintexts to be encrypted and analyze the resulting ciphertexts to gain insights into the key or the encryption process. Similarly, chosen ciphertext attacks can also be executed, where an attacker can manipulate ciphertexts and observe the corresponding plaintext outputs.

== Recent developments ==
While WAKE has been overshadowed by more modern stream ciphers, its study remains relevant in cryptographic research. Ongoing analyses focus on its security properties and potential improvements to mitigate identified vulnerabilities. For instance, some studies have proposed modifications to the S-box structure or alternative feedback mechanisms to enhance resistance against chosen plaintext and ciphertext attacks.

== See also ==
- TEA, XTEA
