= BID 770 =

Cryptography device

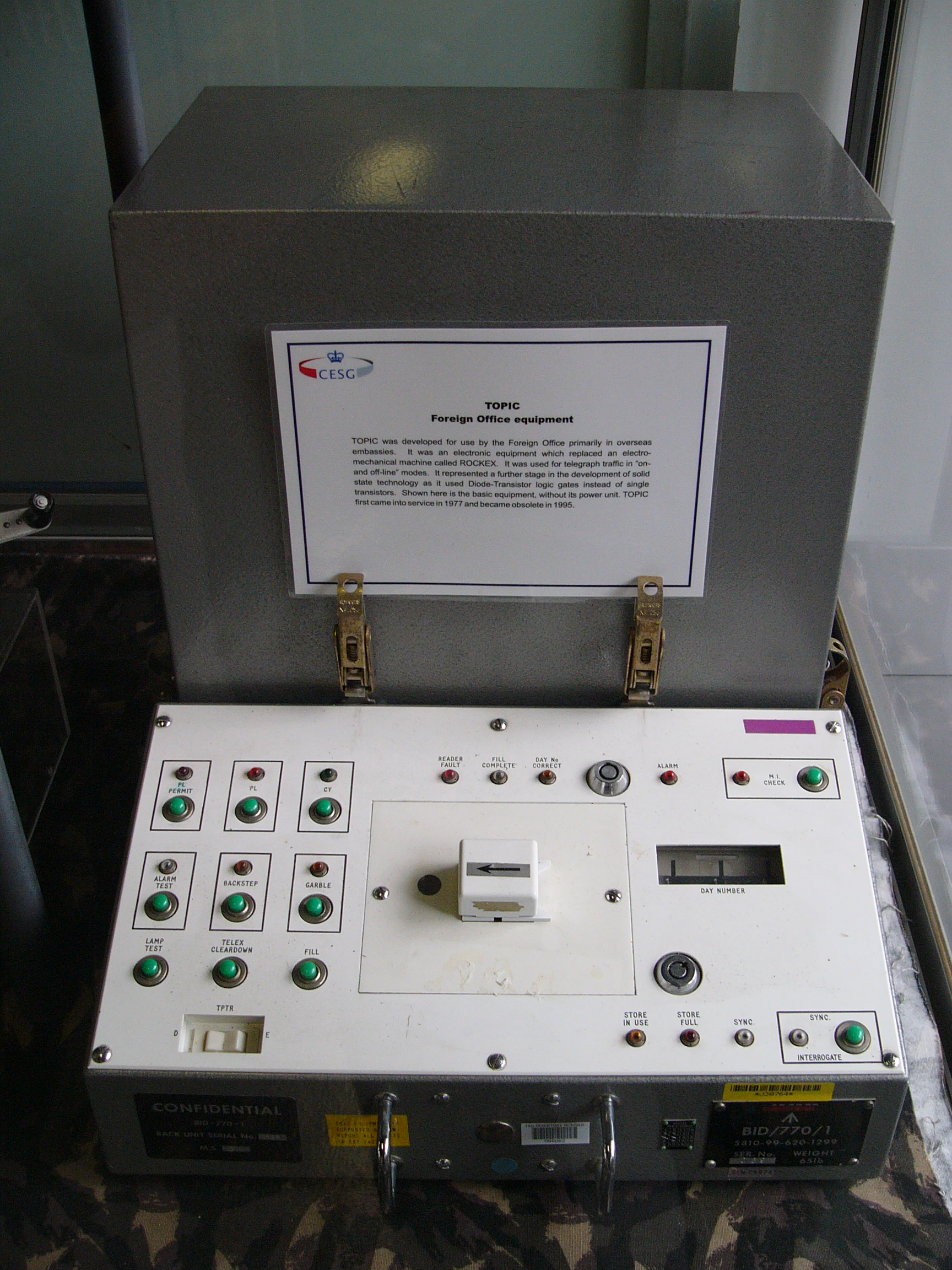
The basic TOPIC equipment without the power supply on display at Bletchley Park.

The BID 770 was a British-built electronic cryptography device, codenamed TOPIC. It was also used by Canada's foreign service under the codename TENEC. TOPIC was brought into service in 1977, and became obsolete in 1995.

TOPIC was used to protect telegraph traffic, and replaced the earlier mechanical system called ROCKEX. It could be operated in both on- and off-line modes. Weighing 65 lb, the machine used diode–transistor logic instead of single transistors.
