= DEAL =

Block cipher

- Round function of DEAL

General
- Designers: Lars Knudsen
- First published: 1998
- Derived from: DES
- Related to: Ladder-DES

Cipher detail
- Key sizes: 128, 192 or 256 bits
- Block sizes: 128 bits
- Structure: Nested Feistel network
- Rounds: 6 (128- and 192-bit key) or 8 (256-bit key)

In cryptography, DEAL (Data Encryption Algorithm with Larger blocks) is a symmetric block cipher derived from the Data Encryption Standard (DES). Its design was presented by Lars Knudsen at the SAC conference in 1997, and submitted as a proposal to the AES contest in 1998 by Richard Outerbridge.

DEAL is a Feistel network which uses DES as the round function. It has a 128-bit block size and a variable key size of either 128, 192, or 256 bits; with 128-bit and 192-bit keys it applies 6 rounds, or 8 rounds with 256-bit keys. It has performance comparable to Triple DES, and was therefore relatively slow among AES candidates.

== See also ==
- Ladder-DES
- Luby–Rackoff block cipher
