= Plaintext-aware encryption =

Plaintext-awareness is a notion of security for public-key encryption. A cryptosystem is plaintext-aware if it is difficult for any efficient algorithm to come up with a valid ciphertext without being aware of the corresponding plaintext.

From a lay point of view, this is a strange property. Normally, a ciphertext is computed by encrypting a plaintext. If a ciphertext is created this way, its creator would be aware, in some sense, of the plaintext. However, many cryptosystems are not plaintext-aware. As an example, consider the RSA cryptosystem without padding. In the RSA cryptosystem, plaintexts and ciphertexts are both values modulo N (the modulus). Therefore, RSA is not plaintext aware: one way of generating a ciphertext without knowing the plaintext is to simply choose a random number modulo N.

In fact, plaintext-awareness is a very strong property. Any cryptosystem that is semantically secure and is plaintext-aware is actually secure against a chosen-ciphertext attack, since any adversary that chooses ciphertexts would already know the plaintexts associated with them.

== History ==
The concept of plaintext-aware encryption was developed by Mihir Bellare and Phillip Rogaway in their paper on optimal asymmetric encryption, as a method to prove that a cryptosystem is chosen-ciphertext secure.

== Further research ==
Limited research on plaintext-aware encryption has been done since Bellare and Rogaway's paper. Although several papers have applied the plaintext-aware technique in proving encryption schemes are chosen-ciphertext secure, only three papers revisit the concept of plaintext-aware encryption itself, both focussed on the definition given by Bellare and Rogaway that inherently require random oracles. Plaintext-aware encryption is known to exist when a public-key infrastructure is assumed. Also, it has been shown that weaker forms of plaintext-awareness exist under the knowledge of exponent assumption, a non-standard assumption about Diffie-Hellman triples. Finally a variant of the Cramer Shoup encryption scheme was shown to be fully plaintext aware in the standard model under the knowledge of exponent assumption.

== See also ==
- Topics in cryptography
