= Averaging argument =

In computational complexity theory and cryptography, averaging argument is a standard argument for proving theorems. It usually allows us to convert probabilistic polynomial-time algorithms into non-uniform polynomial-size circuits.

== Example ==
Example: If every person likes at least 1/3 of the books in a library, then the library has a book, which at least 1/3 of people like.

Proof: Suppose there are $N$ people and $B$ books. Each person likes at least $B/3$ of the books. Let people leave a mark on the book they like. Then, there will be at least $M=(NB)/3$ marks. The averaging argument claims that there exists a book with at least $N/3$ marks on it. Assume, to the contradiction, that no such book exists. Then, every book has fewer than $N/3$ marks. However, since there are $B$ books, the total number of marks will be fewer than $(NB)/3$, contradicting the fact that there are at least $M$ marks. $\scriptstyle\blacksquare$

== Formalized definition of averaging argument ==
Let X and Y be sets, let p be a predicate on X × Y and let f be a real number in the interval [0, 1]. If for each x in X and at least f |Y| of the elements y in Y satisfy p(x, y), then there exists a y in Y such that there exist at least f |X| elements x in X that satisfy p(x, y).

There is another definition, defined using the terminology of probability theory.

Let $f$ be some function. The averaging argument is the following claim: if we have a circuit $C$ such that $C(x, y) = f(x)$ with probability at least $\rho$, where $x$ is chosen at random and $y$ is chosen independently from some distribution $Y$ over $\{0, 1\}^m$ (which might not even be efficiently sampleable) then there exists a single string $y_0 \in \{0, 1\}^m$ such that $\Pr_x[C(x, y_0) = f(x)] \ge \rho$.

Indeed, for every $y$ define $p_y$ to be $\Pr_x[C(x, y) = f(x)]$ then

$$\Pr_{x,y}[C(x, y) = f(x)] = E_y[p_y] \,$$

and then this reduces to the claim that for every random variable $Z$, if $E[Z] \ge \rho$ then $\Pr[Z \ge \rho] > 0$ (this holds since $E[Z]$ is the weighted average of $Z$ and clearly if the average of some values is at least $\rho$ then one of the values must be at least $\rho$).

== Application ==
This argument has wide use in complexity theory (e.g. proving $\mathsf{BPP}\subsetneq\mathsf{P/poly}$) and cryptography (e.g. proving that indistinguishable encryption results in semantic security). A plethora of such applications can be found in Goldreich's books.
