= Strong secrecy =

Type of cryptographic security

Strong secrecy is a term used in formal proof-based cryptography for making propositions about the security of cryptographic protocols. It is a stronger notion of security than syntactic (or weak) secrecy. Strong secrecy is related to the concept of semantic security or indistinguishability used in the computational proof-based approach. Bruno Blanchet provides the following definition for strong secrecy:

Strong secrecy means that an adversary cannot see any difference when the value of the secret changes

For example, if a process encrypts a message m an attacker can differentiate between different messages, since their ciphertexts will be different. Thus m is not a strong secret. If however, probabilistic encryption were used, m would be a strong secret. The randomness incorporated into the encryption algorithm will yield different ciphertexts for the same value of m.

== See also ==
- Semantic security
