= CCA2 =

CCA2 can refer to:

- cryptographic Adaptive chosen-ciphertext attack
- ICAO airport code of New Germany Water Aerodrome
