= RCCA security =

Security notion in cryptography

Replayable CCA security (RCCA security) is a security notion in cryptography that relaxes the older notion of security against a chosen-ciphertext attack (CCA, more precisely adaptive security notion CCA2). All CCA-secure systems are RCCA secure but the converse is not true. The claim is that for many use cases, CCA is too strong, and RCCA suffices. A certain number of cryptographic schemes have now been proved to be RCCA-secure, instead of CCA secure.

The term was introduced in 2003 in a research publication by Ran Canetti, Hugo Krawczyk and Jesper B. Nielsen.
