= MGF =

MGF may stand for:

- MG F / MG TF, a 1995 mid-engined, rear wheel drive roadster manufactured by the Rover Group
- Machine Gun Fellatio, an Australian alternative band
- Magnesium fluoride (chemical formula MgF_{2})
- Malagasy franc, the former currency of Madagascar in ISO 4217 code
- Mechano growth factor, a peptide hormone produced in muscles in response to training, considered an isoform of IGF-1
- Moment-generating function, in probability and statistics
- .mgf, (for Mascot generic format) a data file format used by Mascot mass spectrometry software
- Mask generation function, a function generating an arbitrary number of bits for a given input (for example MGF1 from PKCS 1)
