= Access structure =

Cryptography stub

Access structures are used in the study of security systems where multiple parties need to work together to obtain a resource. Groups of parties that are granted access are called qualified. In set theoretic terms they are referred to as qualified sets; in turn, the set of all such qualified sets is called the access structure of the system. Less formally it is a description of who needs to cooperate with whom in order to access the resource.

== Background ==
In its original use in cryptography, the resource was a secret shared among the participants. Only subgroups of participants contained in the access structure are able to join their shares to recompute the secret. More generally, the resource can also be a task that a group of people can complete together, such as creating a digital signature, or decrypting an encrypted message.

It is reasonable to assume that access structures are monotone in the sense that, if a subset S is in the access structure, all sets that contain S as a subset should also form part of the access structure.

== See also ==
- Access control
- Secret sharing
- Threshold cryptosystem
