= Naccache (surname) =

Naccache is a surname. Notable people with the surname include:

- David Naccache (born 1967), cryptographer
  - Naccache–Stern cryptosystem
- Lionel Naccache (born 1969), French neurologist
- Huda Naccache (fl. from 2011), Arab-Israeli model
