= DKG =

DKG, or dkg, may refer to:

- Distributed key generation, a cryptographic process in which multiple parties contribute to the calculation of a shared public and private key set
- DKG, the National Rail station code for Dorking railway station, Surrey, England
- dkg, the ISO 639-3 code for the Kadung language in Nigeria
