= JDoe =

Public benefit corporation

JDoe is a public benefit corporation which allows survivors and witnesses to anonymously report sexual misconduct through its app.

== Model ==
JDoe is free for users and is available as a mobile app for iOS and Android. Users can report assaults anonymously identifying their offenders by methods such as name, email, or Facebook URL. The app uses homomorphic encryption which allows the company to use identifying information from reports without knowing what the information is itself. Users can choose to keep their reports in "escrow" until another user makes a report against the same perpetrator. When multiple reports are made against the same offender, users are notified of the existence of matches and are encouraged to pursue civil litigation together against the offender.

Lawyers pay to get new clients for civil suits resulting from multiple assault reports against the same perpetrator. Such cases are thought to be more effective when victims take class action as a group. Lawyers with app access can reach out to users who have the choice to respond. Matches will be notified if another victim of the same perpetrator contacts a law firm. Lawyers take cases on contingency and JDoe profits from attorney legal marketing fees and successful case outcomes. As of 2019, the company claimed to be working with 30 law firms and to have helped identify 65 offenders.

== Founder ==
JDoe founder Ryan Soscia, a survivor himself, began working on the app in 2014 after hearing several friends recount being assaulted by the same person a few years prior. Soscia sought to use technology to make the reporting process easier. Soscia took a leave of absence from University of California, San Diego to work on the app with a venture capital firm, eventually being selected as a fellow in the Halcyon Incubator and the LexisNexis Legal Tech Accelerator.

== Criticism ==
Since the app creates matches based on user reports, concerns have been raised about potential harm toward those affected by false allegations. Soscia has said that the system itself weeds out false reports since only lawyers have access to the reports and are unlikely to take cases that will not hold up in court.

Some critics have claimed that JDoe would be required to turn over user information if ordered to do so by a court. However, Soscia claims that because of the encryption setup, JDoe would be unable to access user data even if compelled by a warrant.
