= Damgard =

Damgard may refer to:

== People ==
- Ivan Damgård (born 1956), Danish cryptographer

== Other ==
- Damgård–Jurik cryptosystem
- Merkle–Damgård construction
