= Shai Halevi =

Israeli cryptographer (born 1966)

- שי הלוי
- Born: 1966 (age 59–60); Israel
- Education: Technion (B.A.); Technion (M.Sc.); MIT (Ph.D.)
- Known for: Indistinguishability obfuscation; Homomorphic encryption; Random oracle
- Scientific career
- Fields: Computer science, cryptography
- Workplaces: IBM T.J. Watson Research Center, Algorand Foundation
- Thesis: Theory and Practice of Secret Commitment (1997)
- Doctoral advisor: Silvio Micali
- Website: alum.mit.edu/www/shaih

Shai Halevi (Hebrew: שי הלוי; born 1966) is a computer scientist who works on cryptography research at Amazon Web Services.

Born in Israel in 1966, Halevi received a B.A. and M.Sc. in computer science from the Technion, Israel Institute of Technology in 1991 and 1993. He received his Ph.D. in computer science from Massachusetts Institute of Technology in 1997 and then joined IBM's Thomas J. Watson Research Center, where he was a principal research staff member until 2019. Between 2019 and 2023, he was a research fellow at Algorand Foundation, a blockchain startup founded by Silvio Micali.

== Research ==
Shai Halevi's research interests are in cryptography and security. He has published numerous original technical research papers, three of which were awarded the IBM Pat Goldberg memorial best-paper award (in 2004, 2012, and 2013). Notable contributions by Shai Halevi include:

- Obfuscation. Halevi is a co-inventor of the first candidate general-purpose indistinguishability obfuscation schemes, with security based on a mathematical conjecture. This development generated much interest in the cryptography community and was called "a watershed moment for cryptography."
- Cryptographic Multilinear Maps. Halevi is a co-inventor of Cryptographic Multilinear Maps (which constitute the main technical tool behind cryptographic obfuscation and many other applications), solving a long-standing open problem.
- Homomorphic Encryption. Halevi is one of the leading researchers on homomorphic encryption. He authored many articles, gave invited lectures and tutorials on the topic, and he is also the principal developer (together with Victor Shoup) of the HElib homormophic-encryption software library.
- The Random Oracle Model. Halevi co-authored the influential work that pointed out for the first time the existence of "structurally flawed" cryptosystems that nonetheless have a proof of security in the random-oracle model.

Since 2013 Halevi is the chair of the steering committee of the Theory of Cryptography Conference. He served on the board of directors of the International Association for Cryptologic Research. He chaired the CRYPTO conference in 2009 and co-chaired the TCC conference in 2006. Halevi also gave many invited talks, including in the USENIX Security Symposium in 2008 and the PKC conference in 2014.

== Software ==
Halevi maintains two open-source software projects: The HElib homomorphic-encryption library, and a web-system for submission/review of articles to academic conferences.
