= DCRA =

DCRA may refer to:

- Dane County Regional Airport
- District of Columbia Department of Consumer and Regulatory Affairs
- Dominion of Canada Rifle Association
- Decisional composite residuosity assumption
