= Knapsack (disambiguation) =

The word knapsack can refer to:

- a backpack
- Knapsack, Germany, a locality of Hürth, Rhine-Erft district, North Rhine-Westphalia
- the knapsack problem, a math problem

- the subset sum problem, a special case of the above
- Naccache-Stern knapsack cryptosystem, a cryptosystem based on the knapsack problem

- Knapsack (band), an American band
- "Knapsack!", an episode of Aqua Teen Hunger Force
