= Zvika Brakerski =

Israeli cryptographer

- צביקה ברקרסקי
- Education: Tel-Aviv University; Weizmann Institute
- Known for: Homomorphic encryption
- Awards: Gödel Prize
- Scientific career
- Fields: Cryptography
- Doctoral advisor: Shafi Goldwasser
- Other academic advisors: Dan Boneh

Zvika Brakerski (Hebrew: צביקה ברקרסקי) is an Israeli cryptographer and associate professor in the Department of Computer Science and Applied Mathematics at the Weizmann Institute of Science. He is known for his work on homomorphic encryption, particularly in developing the foundations of second generation FHE schema, for which he was awarded the 2022 Gödel Prize.

== Research ==
In 2011, Brakerski and Vinod Vaikuntanathan introduced a scheme for fully homomorphic encryption based on the learning with errors problem. Later with Craig Gentry, they constructed the Brakerski-Gentry-Vaikuntanathan (BGV) scheme, which can be instantiated in leveled mode without bootstrapping. For these works, Brakerski, Vaikuntanathan, and Gentry were jointly awarded the Gödel Prize in 2022.

In 2012 Brakerski published a paper at the Annual Cryptology Conference Fully homomorphic encryption without modulus switching from classical GapSVP. This paper formed the basis of the BFV scheme which, along with BGV, is one of the most well-known second-generation FHE schema.
