= Threshold =

Threshold may refer to:

== Science ==
=== Biology ===
- Threshold (reference value)
- Absolute threshold
- Absolute threshold of hearing
- Action potential
- Aerobic threshold
- Anaerobic threshold
- Dark adaptation threshold
- Epidemic threshold
- Flicker fusion threshold
- Masking threshold
- Odor detection threshold
- Renal threshold
- Seizure threshold
- Sensory threshold
- Threshold expression
- Threshold limit value
- Threshold model
- Threshold of pain
- Threshold potential

=== Other science-related ===
- Ecological threshold
- Error threshold (evolution)
- Extinction threshold
- Lasing threshold
- Percolation threshold
- Polygyny threshold model
- Threshold cryptosystem
- Threshold displacement energy
- Threshold energy
- Threshold graph
- Threshold knowledge
- Threshold model
- Threshold voltage
- Thresholding (image processing)
- Transparency threshold

== Architecture ==
- Threshold (architecture), the sill of a door

== Literature ==
- Threshold (DC Comics), a comic book published by DC Comics
- Threshold (Douglass novel), 1997 a fantasy novel by Sara Douglass
- Threshold (Morris novel), a 1990 science fiction novel by Chris and Janet Morris
- Threshold (Palmer novel), a 1985 science fiction novel by David R. Palmer
- Threshold Editions, a conservative imprint
- Threshold, an ancient civilization in Marvel Comics
- Threshold, a 1996 science fiction novel by Ben Mezrich
- Threshold, a 1997 Christian novel by Bill Myers
- Threshold, a 2001 novel by Caitlín R. Kiernan
- Threshold, the first volume of the collected short fiction of Roger Zelazny

== Media ==
- Threshold (1981 film)
- Threshold, a 2008 film directed by Deepak Rauniyar
- Threshold (TV series), an American science fiction drama TV series
- "Threshold" (Stargate SG-1), an episode of the TV series
- "Threshold" (Star Trek: Voyager), an episode of the TV series
- Threshold Entertainment, a Hollywood Intellectual Property Management and Production Company
- Threshold Podcast, a podcast focused on long-form reporting of climate justice topic
- Threshold (1981 video game), a 1981 video game
- Threshold (2024 video game), a 2024 video game

== Music ==
- Threshold (band), a UK progressive metal band
- Threshold House, a record label created by Coil
- Threshold Records, a record label created by The Moody Blues

=== Albums ===
- Threshold (album), a 2006 album by HammerFall
- Thresholds (album), a 1992 album by Nocturnus
- Threshold, a 1997 album by Erik Norlander

=== Songs ===
- "Threshold", by Pocahaunted, 2010
- "Threshold", by Sex Bob-Omb from the Scott Pilgrim vs. the World soundtrack, 2010
- "Threshold", by Slayer from God Hates Us All, 2001
- "Threshold", by the Steve Miller Band from Book of Dreams, 1977
- "Threshold", by Turnover from Peripheral Vision, 2015
- "The Threshold", by Connie Smith from Connie Smith, 1965

== Other uses ==
- Thresholds, a nonprofit organization serving persons with mental illnesses and substance abuse problems in Illinois
- Threshold Audio, a manufacturer of high end audio amplifiers
- Displaced threshold, an aviation term
- Election threshold, a concept in voting systems
- Poverty thresholds (United States Census Bureau)
- In government procurement, the expenditure value which determines which rules and procedures are to be applied to a proposed purchase
