= Dan Geer =

American computer scientist

Daniel Earl Geer Jr.
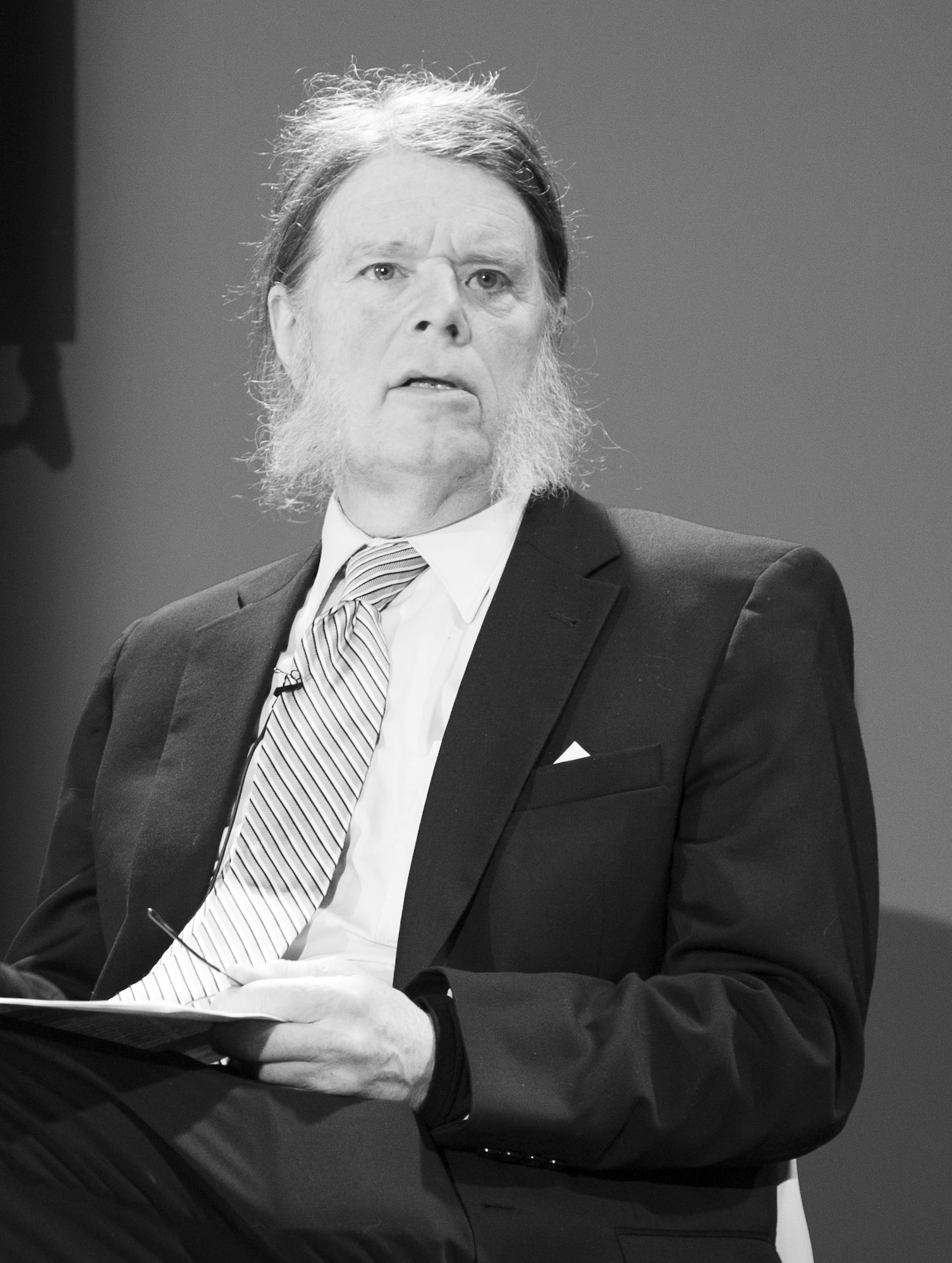
- Dan Geer, 2015
- Citizenship: USA
- Education: Harvard University (SC.D. Biostatistics); MIT (SB EECS)
- Known for: Project Athena; Open Market; CertCo
- Scientific career
- Fields: Computer Scientist
- Workplaces: MIT; CertCo; SystemExperts; In-Q-Tel

Dan Geer is a computer security analyst and risk management specialist. He is recognized for raising awareness of critical computer and network security issues before the risks were widely understood, and for ground-breaking work on the economics of security.

== Career ==
Geer is currently the chief information security officer for In-Q-Tel, a not-for-profit venture capital firm that invests in technology to support the Central Intelligence Agency.

In 2003, Geer's 24-page report entitled "CyberInsecurity: The Cost of Monopoly" was released by the Computer and Communications Industry Association (CCIA). The paper argued that Microsoft's dominance of desktop computer operating systems is a threat to national security. Geer was fired (from consultancy @Stake) the day the report was made public. Geer has cited subsequent changes in the Vista operating system (notably a location-randomization feature) as evidence that Microsoft "accepted the paper."

Geer received a Bachelor of Science in Electrical Engineering and Computer Science from MIT, where he was a member of the Theta Deuteron charge of Theta Delta Chi fraternity. He also received a Sc.D. in biostatistics from Harvard, and has worked for:

- Health Sciences Computing Facility, Harvard School of Public Health
- Project Athena, MIT
- Digital Equipment Corporation
- Geer Zolot & Associates
- OpenVision Technologies
- Open Market
- Certco
- @stake (acquired by Symantec in November 2004)
- Verdasys

In 2011, Geer received the USENIX Lifetime Achievement Award.
