= Jung Hee Cheon =

South Korean cryptographer

- 천정희
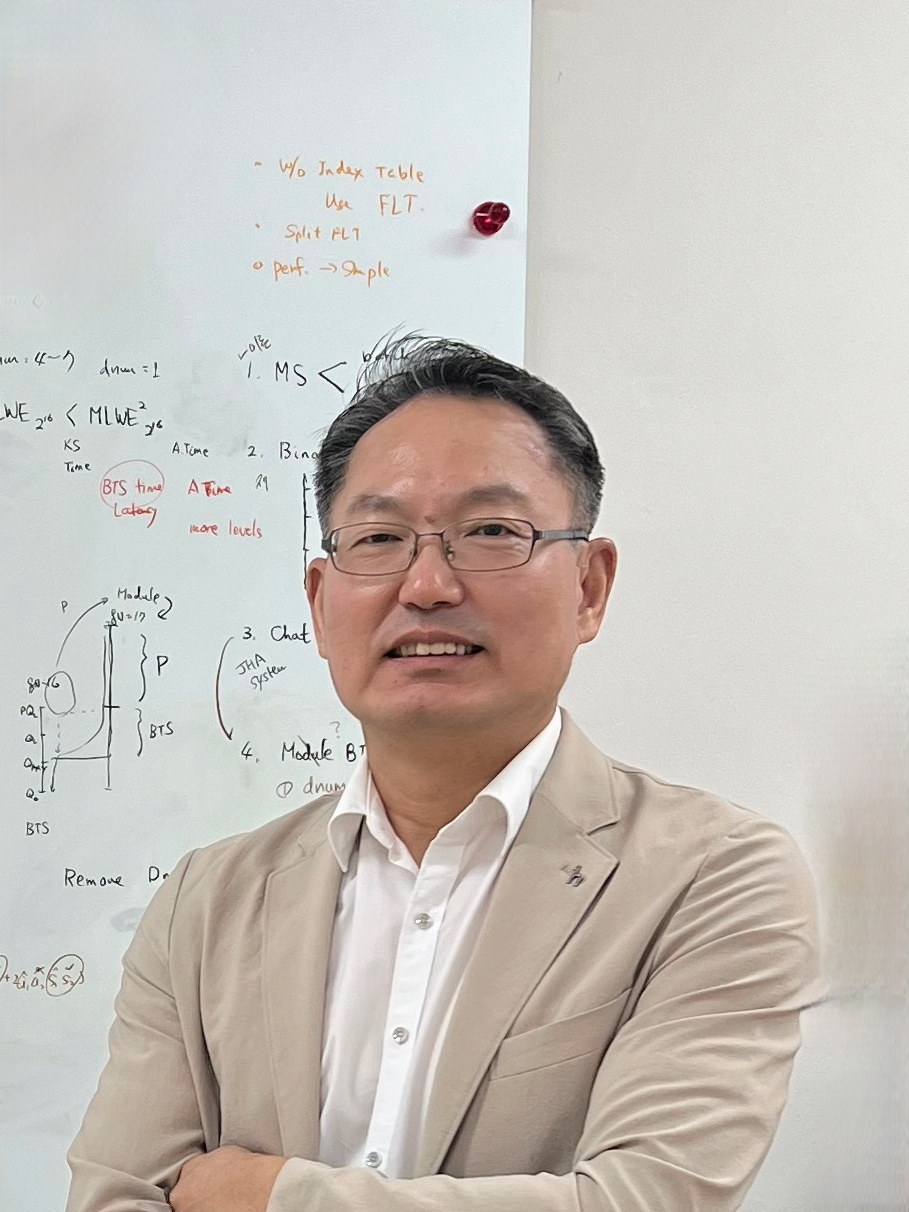
- Born: June 11, 1969 (age 57); South Korea
- Education: KAIST
- Known for: the CKKS scheme, the 4th generation FHE
- Scientific career
- Fields: Mathematics, Cryptology
- Workplaces: Seoul National University
- Thesis: The order of the reduction of a point in the Mordell-Weil group of an elliptic curve (1997)
- Doctoral advisor: Sang-Geun Han
- Website: web.math.snu.ac.kr/~jhcheon/

Jung Hee Cheon (born 1969) is a South Korean professor in the Department of Mathematical Sciences, the director of Industrial & Mathematical Data Analytics Research Center (IMDARC) at Seoul National University (SNU), and CEO of CryptoLab. His research interests include computational number theory, cryptology, and information security. He is one of the co-inventors of HEaaN.

== Education and career ==
Born in South Korea, Cheon received his Bachelor of Arts, Master of Science, and Ph.D, all in Mathematics from KAIST in 1991, 1993, and 1997, respectively.

Before joining SNU, he was a senior member of research staff at ETRI (1997–2000), a visiting scientist at Brown University (2000), and an assistant professor at ICU (2000-2003).

Dr. Jung Hee Cheon is also one of the inventors of braid cryptography, a group-based cryptography scheme, and was previously known for his work on an efficient algorithm for the strong DH problem.

Cheon is actively working on homomorphic encryptions and their applications, including machine learning, homomorphic control systems, and DNA computation on encrypted data.

== Awards ==
- 2023: Fellow of the IACR
- 2022: Order of Service Merit (Green Stripes)
- 2022: Member of the KAST
- 2021: PKC Test-of-Time award
- 2020: Asian Scientist 100, Asian Scientist
- 2019: POSCO TJ Park Prize, POSCO TJ Park Foundation
- 2018: Scientist of the Month, Ministry of Science and ICT and National Research Foundation of Korea
- 2015: The best paper award in Eurocrypt
- 2008: The best paper award in Asiacrypt

== Service ==
Dr. Jung Hee Cheon has served as program chair and co-chair for multiple conferences, including ICISC 2008, ANTS-XI, Asiacrypt 2015/2016, MathCrypt 2013/2018/2019/2021, and PQC2021/2022. He was one of the two invited speakers at Asiacrypt 2020. He also contributes as an editor of the Journal of Cryptology.
