= HElib =

- Developer: IBM
- Initial release: May 5, 2013; 12 years ago
- Stable release: 2.3.0 / July 18, 2023; 2 years ago
- Repository: github.com/homenc/HElib
- Written in: C++
- Platform: Microsoft Windows, MacOS, Linux
- License: Apache License (2.0)
- Website: homenc.github.io/HElib

Homomorphic Encryption library or HElib is a free and open-source cross platform software developed by IBM that implements various forms of homomorphic encryption.

== History ==
HElib was primarily developed by Shai Halevi and Victor Shoup, shortly after Craig Gentry was a researcher at IBM, with the initial release being on May 5, 2013.

== Features ==
The library implements the Brakerski-Gentry-Vaikuntanathan (BGV) fully homomorphic encryption scheme, as well as optimizations such as Smart-Vercauteren ciphertext packing techniques.

HElib is written in C++ and uses the NTL mathematical library.
