= Victor Shoup =

American computer scientist

- Education: UW-Eau Claire; UW-Madison
- Known for: Cramer–Shoup cryptosystem
- Scientific career
- Fields: Computer science; Mathematics
- Workplaces: Category Labs; Offchain Labs; DFINITY; NYU Courant Institute; AT&T Bell Labs; University of Toronto; Saarland University; IBM Zurich Research Lab
- Thesis: "Removing Randomness from Computational Number Theory" (1989)
- Doctoral advisor: Eric Bach
- Website: www.shoup.net

Victor Shoup is a computer scientist and mathematician. He obtained a PhD in computer science from the University of Wisconsin–Madison in 1989, and he did his undergraduate work at the University of Wisconsin-Eau Claire. He is a professor at the Courant Institute of Mathematical Sciences at New York University, focusing on algorithm and cryptography courses. He is currently a Researcher at Category Labs and has held positions at Offchain Labs, AT&T Bell Labs, the University of Toronto, Saarland University, and the IBM Zurich Research Laboratory.

Shoup's main research interests and contributions are computer algorithms relating to number theory, algebra, and cryptography. His contributions to these fields include:

- The Cramer–Shoup cryptosystem asymmetric encryption algorithm bears his name.
- His freely available (under the terms of the GNU GPL) C++ library of number theory algorithms, NTL, is widely used and well regarded for its high performance.
- He is the author of a widely used textbook, A Computational Introduction to Number Theory and Algebra, which is freely available online.
- He has proved (while at IBM Zurich) a lower bound to the computational complexity for solving the discrete logarithm problem in the generic group model. This is a problem in computational group theory which is of considerable importance to public-key cryptography.
- He acted as editor for the ISO 18033-2 standard for public-key cryptography.
- One of the primary developers of HElib.

== Bibliography ==
- A Computational Introduction to Number Theory and Algebra, 2nd Edition, 2009, Cambridge University Press, ISBN 978-0521516440, ISBN 0521516447
