= Naccache–Stern knapsack cryptosystem =

Security system

The Naccache–Stern Knapsack cryptosystem is an atypical public-key cryptosystem developed by David Naccache and Jacques Stern in 1997. This cryptosystem is deterministic, and hence is not semantically secure. While unbroken to date, this system also lacks provable security.

== System overview ==
This system is based on a type of knapsack problem. Specifically, the underlying problem is this: given integers c,n,p and v_{0},...,v_{n}, find a vector $x \in \{0,1\}^n$ such that

$$c \equiv \prod_{i=0}^n v_i^{x_i} \mod p$$

The idea here is that when the v_{i} are relatively prime and much smaller than the modulus p this problem can be solved easily. It is this observation which allows decryption.

=== Key Generation ===
To generate a public/private key pair

- Pick a large prime modulus p.
- Pick a positive integer n and for i from 0 to n, set p_{i} to be the ith prime, starting with p_{0} = 2 and such that $\prod_{i=0}^np_i < p$.
- Pick a secret integer s < p-1, such that gcd(p-1,s) = 1.
- Set $v_i = \sqrt[s]{p_i} \mod p$.

The public key is then p,n and v_{0},...,v_{n}. The private key is s.

=== Encryption ===
To encrypt an n-bit long message m, calculate

$$c = \prod_{i=0}^n v_i^{m_i} \mod p$$

where m_{i} is the ith bit of the message m.

=== Decryption ===
To decrypt a message c, calculate

$$m = \sum_{i=0}^n \frac{2^i}{p_i-1} \times \left( \gcd(p_i,c^s \mod p) -1 \right)$$

This works because the fraction

$$\frac{ \gcd(p_i,c^s \mod p) - 1 }{p_i - 1}$$

is 0 or 1 depending on whether p_{i} divides c^{s} mod p.

== Security ==
The security of the trapdoor function relies on the difficulty of the following multiplicative knapsack problem: given
$$c = \prod_{i=0}^n
v_i^{m_i}\pmod p,$$
recover the $m_i$. Unlike additive knapsack-based cryptosystems, such as Merkle-Hellman, techniques like Euclidean lattice reduction do not apply to this problem.

The best known generic attack consists of solving the discrete logarithm problem to recover $s$ from $p, p_i, v_i$, which is considered difficult for a classical computer. However, the quantum algorithm of Shor efficiently solves this problem. Furthermore, currently (2023), there is no proof that the Naccache-Stern knapsack reduces to the discrete logarithm problem.

The best known specific attack (in 2018) uses the birthday theorem to partially invert the function without knowing the trapdoor, assuming that the message has a very low Hamming weight.

== See also ==
- Merkle–Hellman knapsack cryptosystem
- Graham–Shamir knapsack cryptosystem
