= Decisional composite residuosity assumption =

Decidability assumption

The decisional composite residuosity assumption (DCRA) is a mathematical assumption used in cryptography. In particular, the assumption is used in the proof of the Paillier cryptosystem.

Informally, the DCRA states that given a composite $n$ and an integer $z$, it is hard to decide whether $z$ is an $n$-residue modulo $n^2$. I.e. whether there exists a $y$ such that

$$z \equiv y^n \pmod{n^2}. \,$$

== See also ==
- Quadratic residuosity problem
- Higher residuosity problem
