= Naccache–Stern cryptosystem =

Public-key security system

The Naccache–Stern cryptosystem is a homomorphic public-key cryptosystem whose security rests on the higher residuosity problem. The Naccache–Stern cryptosystem was discovered by David Naccache and Jacques Stern in 1998.

== Scheme Definition ==
Like many public key cryptosystems, this scheme works in the group $(\mathbb{Z}/n\mathbb{Z})^*$ where n is a product of two large primes. This scheme is homomorphic and hence malleable.

=== Key Generation ===
- Pick a family of k small distinct primes p_{1},...,p_{k}.
- Divide the set in half and set $u = \prod_{i=1}^{k/2} p_i$ and $v = \prod_{k/2+1}^k p_i$.
- Set $\sigma = uv = \prod_{i=1}^k p_i$
- Choose large primes a and b such that both p = 2au+1 and q=2bv+1 are prime.
- Set n=pq.
- Choose a random g mod n such that g has order φ(n)/4.

The public key is the numbers (σ,n,g) and the private key is the pair (p,q).

The primes (p_{1}, ..., p_{k}) are also effectively public, since they can be efficiently recovered from the public value σ = Π pi, given that they are small. These primes are required during decryption, where computations are performed modulo each p_{i} in order to recover the message.

When k=1 this is essentially the Benaloh cryptosystem.

=== Message Encryption ===
This system allows encryption of a message m in the group $\mathbb{Z}/\sigma\mathbb{Z}$.

- Pick a random $x \in \mathbb{Z}/n\mathbb{Z}$.
- Calculate $E(m) = x^\sigma g^m \mod n$

Then E(m) is an encryption of the message m.

=== Message Decryption ===
To decrypt, we first find m mod p_{i} for each i, and then we apply the Chinese remainder theorem to calculate m mod $\sigma$.

Given a ciphertext c, to decrypt, we calculate

- $c_i \equiv c^{\phi(n)/p_i} \mod n$. Thus

$$\begin{matrix} c^{\phi(n)/p_i} &\equiv& x^{\sigma \phi(n)/p_i} g^{m\phi(n)/p_i} \mod n\\ &\equiv& g^{(m_i + y_ip_i)\phi(n)/p_i} \mod n \\ &\equiv& g^{m_i\phi(n)/p_i} \mod n \end{matrix}$$

where $m_i \equiv m \mod p_i$.

- Since p_{i} is chosen to be small, m_{i} can be recovered by exhaustive search, i.e. by comparing $c_i$ to $g^{j\phi(n)/p_i}$ for j from 1 to p_{i}-1.
- Once m_{i} is known for each i, m can be recovered by a direct application of the Chinese remainder theorem.

== Security ==
The semantic security of the Naccache–Stern cryptosystem rests on an extension of the quadratic residuosity problem known as the higher residuosity problem.
