= William Stallings =

American author

William Stallings is an American author. He has written computer science textbooks on operating systems, computer networks, computer organization, and cryptography.

== Early life ==
Stallings earned his B.S. in electrical engineering from University of Notre Dame and his PhD in computer science from Massachusetts Institute of Technology.

== Career ==
He maintains a website titled Computer Science Student Resource. He has authored 17 titles, and counting revised editions, a total of over 40 books on these subjects. He has been a technical contributor, technical manager, and an executive with several high-technology firms. He works as an independent consultant whose clients have included computer and networking manufacturers and customers, software development firms, and leading-edge government research institutions.

== Recognition ==
He was awarded Computer Science textbook of the year from the Text and Academic Authors Association three times.

== Books ==
- Computer Organization and Architecture
- Cryptography and Network Security: Principles and Practice
- Data and Computer Communications
- Operating Systems - Internals and Design Principles
- Wireless Communications & Networks
- Computer Security measures: Principles and Practice
- Local and Metropolitan Area Networks
- Network Security Essentials: Applications and Standards
- Business Data Communications - Infrastructure, Networking and Security
