= Cohen's cryptosystem =

Cohen's cryptosystem is a public-key cryptosystem proposed in 1998 by Bram Cohen.

== Key generation ==
In Cohen's cryptosystem, a private key is a positive integer $p$.

The algorithm uses $k$ public-keys $w_0,\ldots,w_{k-1}$ defined as follows:

Generate $k$ random integers $u_0,\ldots,u_{k-1}$ chosen randomly and uniformly between $-B$ and $B$. Where $B$ is some bound.

Let $A=\lfloor\frac{p}{2k}\rfloor$ and generate $k$ random integers $v_0,\ldots,v_{k-1}$ chosen randomly and uniformly between $0$ and $A$.

Define $w_i=(u_i p+v_i)$.

== Encrypting a bit ==
To encrypt a bit $m$ Alice randomly adds $\frac{k}{2}$ public keys and multiplies the result by either 1 (if she wishes to send a 0) or by −1 (if she wishes to send a 1) to obtain the ciphertext $c=(-1)^{m} \sum w_i$.

== De-cryption ==
To de-crypt, Bob computes $h= c \mod p = (-1)^{m} \sum v_i$

It is easy to see that if $m=0$ then $0<h<p/2$. However, if $m=1$ then $p>h>p/2$. Hence Bob can read the bit sent by Alice on the most significant bit of h.
