= Craig Gentry (computer scientist) =

American computer scientist (born 1973)

- Born: 1973 (age 52–53)
- Known for: Fully-homomorphic encryption
- Awards: ACM Doctoral Dissertation Award (2009); Grace Murray Hopper Award (2010); MacArthur Fellowship (2014); Gödel Prize (2022)

Academic background
- Education: Duke University (BS); Harvard University (JD); Stanford University (PhD)
- Thesis: A Fully Homomorphic Encryption Scheme (2009)
- Doctoral advisor: Dan Boneh

Academic work
- Discipline: Cryptography, computer science
- Institutions: IBM Thomas J. Watson Research Center; Algorand

Craig Gentry (born 1973) is an American computer scientist working as CTO of TripleBlind. He is best known for his work in cryptography, specifically fully homomorphic encryption.

== Education ==
In 1993, while studying at Duke University, he became a Putnam Fellow. In 2009, his dissertation, in which he constructed the first Fully Homomorphic Encryption scheme, won the ACM Doctoral Dissertation Award.

== Career ==
In 2010, he won the ACM Grace Murray Hopper Award for the work done in his PhD thesis. In 2014, he won a MacArthur Fellowship. Previously, he was a research scientist at the Algorand Foundation and IBM Thomas J. Watson Research Center. In 2022, he won the Gödel Prize with Zvika Brakerski and Vinod Vaikuntanathan.
