= David Naccache =

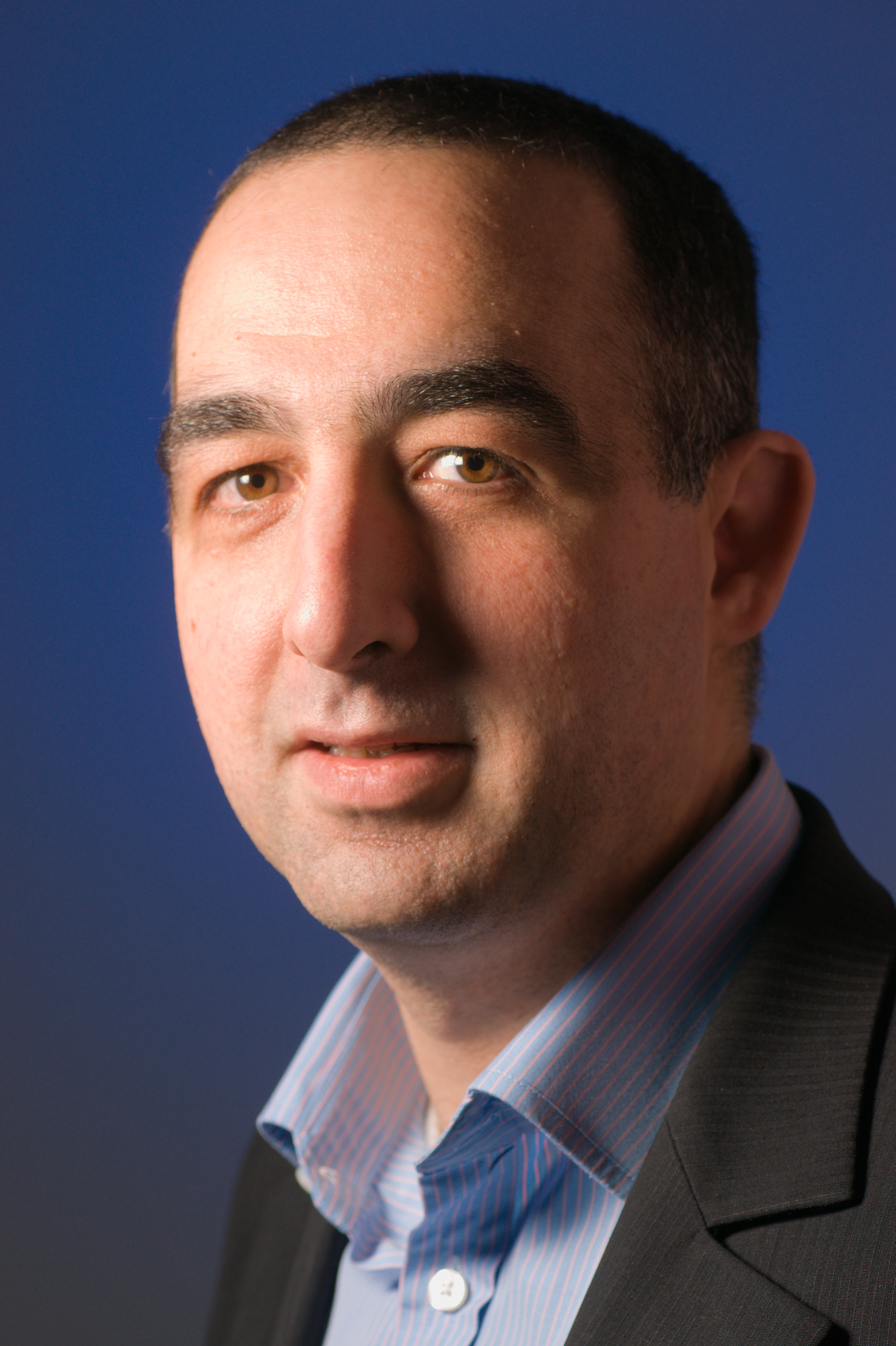
- David Naccache (2011)
- Born: February 21, 1967 (age 59); Beersheba
- Occupations: Cryptographer; Engineer; Consultant; Expert witness; Hacker; Inventor; Mathematician; Computer scientist; University teacher

David Naccache is a cryptographer, currently a professor at the École normale supérieure and a member of its Computer Laboratory. He was previously a professor at Panthéon-Assas University.

== Biography ==
He received his Ph.D. in 1995 from the École nationale supérieure des télécommunications. Naccache's most notable work is in public-key cryptography, including the cryptanalysis of digital signature schemes. Together with Jacques Stern he designed the similarly named but very distinct Naccache-Stern cryptosystem and Naccache-Stern knapsack cryptosystem.

In 2004 David Naccache and Claire Whelan, then employed by Gemplus International, used image processing techniques to uncover redacted information from the declassified 6 August 2001 President's Daily Brief Bin Ladin Determined To Strike in US. They also demonstrated how the same process could be applied to other redacted documents.

Naccache is also a visiting professor and researcher at the Information Security Group of Royal Holloway, University of London.

In 2021, two epidemiologists denounced David Naccache to the management of the École normale supérieure. They accused him of having produced a purported fraudulent report in November 2018 for Genevrier Laboratories in exchange for a large payment (more than €250,000) in defence of a delisted drug, Chondrosulf.. The lawsuit has been declined by a judgment of the Cour supérieure du Québec on August 28, 2024 that "warns [the plaintiffs] against diffmatory tourism" with "justice costs in favor of the defendants [who are David Naccache, the ex-minister Noëlle Lenoir and the CEO of Laboratoires Genévrier Dominique Vacher]".

== Awards ==
In 2020 Naccache was listed as a Fellow of the IACR, the International Association for Cryptologic Research, "for significant contributions to applied cryptography in industry and academia, and for the service to the IACR."
