= Cipolloni =

Cipolloni is an Italian surname. Notable people with the surname include:

- Angelo Cipolloni (born 1970), Italian sprinter
- Enrica Cipolloni (born 1990), Italian heptathlete

== See also ==
- Cipollone
- Cipollini (disambiguation)
- Cipollina (disambiguation)
- Cipolla (disambiguation)
