= Cipolla (surname) =

Cipolla is a surname. Notable people with the surname include:

- Bruno Cipolla (1952–2026), Italian rowing coxswain
- Carlo Maria Cipolla (1922–2000), Italian economic historian
- Chip Cipolla (died 1994), American radio sports announcer
- Claudio Cipolla (born 1955), Italian Catholic bishop
- Glorianda Cipolla (born 1946), Italian alpine skier
- Flavio Cipolla (born 1983), Italian tennis player
- Frank A. Cipolla, American army officer
- Frank Cipolla (journalist), American journalist, author, and businessman
- Gaetano Cipolla, American academic
- Jason Cipolla (born 1974), American basketball player
- Michele Cipolla (died 1947), Italian mathematician
- Roberto Cipolla (born 1963), British computer vision researcher
- Rudy Cipolla (1900–2000), Italian American mandolinist and composer
- Vin Cipolla (born 1956), American entrepreneur and civic leader

== See also ==
- Cipolla (disambiguation)
- Cipollina (disambiguation)
