= Chipolin =

Chipolin or variation, may refer to:

- 281068 Chipolin, a main-belt asteroid discovered in 2006 and named after Chi Po-Lin
- Chi Po-lin (1964–2017; a.k.a. Po Lin Chi, Chi Polin), Taiwanese documentary filmmaker
- Cipolin (also spelled chipolin), a type of marble popular with Ancient Romans and Greeks

== See also ==
- Cipollone (Chipollone)
- Cipollina (disambiguation) (Chipollina)
- Cipollini (disambiguation) (Chipollini)
- Cipollino (disambiguation) (Chipollino)
- Cipolla (disambiguation) (Chipolla)
