= Dixon's factorization method =

Algorithm in number theory

In number theory, Dixon's factorization method (also Dixon's random squares method or Dixon's algorithm) is a general-purpose integer factorization algorithm; it is the prototypical factor base method. Unlike for other factor base methods, its run-time bound comes with a rigorous proof that does not rely on conjectures about the smoothness properties of the values taken by a polynomial.

The algorithm was designed by John D. Dixon, a mathematician at Carleton University, and was published in 1981.

== Basic idea ==
Dixon's method is based on finding a congruence of squares modulo the integer N which is intended to factor. We explain the basic idea here by first describing Fermat's factorization method, then how Dixon's method proceeds differently.

Fermat's factorization method finds such a congruence by selecting random or pseudo-random x values and hoping that the integer x^{2} mod N is a nontrivial perfect square (in the integers):

$$x^2\equiv y^2\quad(\hbox{mod }N),\qquad x\not\equiv\pm y\quad(\hbox{mod }N).$$

For example, if N = 84923, (by starting at 292, the first number greater than √N and counting up) the 505^{2} mod 84923 is 256, the square of 16. So (505 − 16)(505 + 16) = 0 mod 84923. Computing the greatest common divisor of 505 − 16 and N using Euclid's algorithm gives 163, which is a factor of N.

In practice, selecting random x values will take an impractically long time to find a congruence of squares, since there are only √N squares less than N.

Dixon's method replaces the condition "is a nontrivial perfect square" with the much weaker one "has only small prime factors"; for example, there are 292 squares smaller than 84923; 662 numbers smaller than 84923 whose prime factors are only 2,3,5 or 7; and 4767 whose prime factors are all less than 30. (Such numbers are called 7-smooth and 30-smooth, respectively, since they are B-smooth with respect to some bound B.)

Once enough of these B-smooth values are found, linear algebra can be used to search for nontrivial perfect squares for Fermat's factorization method. If there are many numbers $a_1 \ldots a_n$ whose squares can be factorized as $a_i^2 \mod N = \prod_{j=1}^m b_j^{e_{ij}}$ for a fixed set $b_1 \ldots b_m$ of small primes, linear algebra modulo 2 on the matrix $e_{ij}$ will give a subset of the $a_i$ whose squares combine to a product of small primes to an even power — that is, a subset of the $a_i$ whose squares multiply to the square of a (hopefully different) number mod N.

== Method ==
Suppose the composite number N is being factored. Bound B is chosen, and the factor base is identified (which is called P), the set of all primes less than or equal to B. Next, positive integers z are sought such that z^{2} mod N is B-smooth. Therefore we can write, for suitable exponents a_{i},

$$z^2 \text{ mod } N = \prod_{p_i\in P} p_i^{a_i}$$

When enough of these relations have been generated (it is generally sufficient that the number of relations be a few more than the size of P), the methods of linear algebra, such as Gaussian elimination, can be used to multiply together these various relations in such a way that the exponents of the primes on the right-hand side are all even:

$${z_1^2 z_2^2 \cdots z_k^2 \equiv \prod_{p_i\in P} p_i^{a_{i,1}+a_{i,2}+\cdots+a_{i,k}}\ \pmod{N}\quad (\text{where } a_{i,1}+a_{i,2}+\cdots+a_{i,k} \equiv 0\pmod{2}) }$$

This yields a congruence of squares of the form a^{2} ≡ b^{2} (mod N), which can be turned into a factorization of N, N = gcd(a + b, N) × (N/gcd(a + b, N)). This factorization might turn out to be trivial (i.e. N = N × 1), which can only happen if a ≡ ±b (mod N), in which case another try must be made with a different combination of relations; but if a nontrivial pair of factors of N is reached, the algorithm terminates.

== Pseudocode ==
This section is taken directly from Dixon (1981).

Dixon's algorithm

Initialization. Let L be a list of integers in the range [1, n], and let P = {p_{1}, ..., p_{h}} be the list of the h primes ≤ v. Let B and Z be initially empty lists (Z will be indexed by B).

Step 1. If L is empty, exit (algorithm unsuccessful). Otherwise, take the first term z from L, remove it from L, and proceed to Step 2.

Step 2. Compute w as the least positive remainder of z^{2} mod n. Factor w as:

$w = w' \prod_i p_i^{a_i}$

where w′ has no factor in P. If w′ = 1, proceed to Step 3; otherwise, return to Step 1.

Step 3. Let a ← (a_{1}, ..., a_{h}). Add a to B and z to Z. If B has at most h elements, return to Step 1; otherwise, proceed to Step 4.

Step 4. Find the first vector c in B that is linearly dependent (mod 2) on earlier vectors in B. Remove c from B and $z_c$ from Z. Compute coefficients $f_b$ such that:

$\mathbf{c} \equiv \sum_{b \in B} f_b \mathbf{b} \pmod{2}$

Define:

$\mathbf{d} = (d_1, \dots, d_n) \gets \frac{1}{2} \left(\mathbf{c} + \sum f_b \mathbf{b} \right)$

Proceed to Step 5.

Step 5. Compute:

$x \gets z_c \prod_b z_b^{f_b}, \quad y \gets \prod_i p_i^{d_i}$

so that:

$x^2 \equiv \prod_i p_i^{2d_i} = y^2 \mod n.$

If $x \equiv y$ or $x \equiv -y \pmod{n}$, return to Step 1. Otherwise, return:

$\gcd(n, x + y)$

which provides a nontrivial factor of n, and terminate successfully.

== Step-by-step example ==
In this example, we factorize (n = 84923) using Dixon's algorithm. This example is lightly adapted from the LeetArxiv substack. Credit is given to the original author.

- Initialization:
  - Define a list of numbers L, ranging from 1 to 84923:

$$L = \{1, \dots, 84923\}$$

- Define a value v, which is the smoothness factor:

$$v = 7$$

- Define a list P containing all the prime numbers less than or equal to v:

$$P = {2, 3, 5, 7}$$

- Define B and Z, two empty lists. B is a list of powers, while Z is a list of accepted integers:

$$B = [ ]$$
$$Z = [ ]$$

- Step 1: Iterating $z$ values
  - Start a for loop that indexes the list $L$. The current element in $L$ is labeled as $z$. The for loop exits at the end of the list, or when Step 5 breaks the loop.

int n = 84923;
for (int i = 1; i <= n; i++)
{
    int z = i;
    // Remaining steps go here.
    // Step 4 can trigger Step 5.
    // Step 5 can break the loop.
}

- Step 2: Computing $z^2 \mod n$ and v-smooth Prime Factorization
  - To proceed, compute $z^2 \mod 84923$ for each z, then express the result as a prime factorization.

$$1^2 \mod 84923 \equiv 1 \mod 84923 = 2^0 \cdot 3^0 \cdot 5^0 \cdot 7^0 \mod 84923$$
$$\vdots$$
$$513^2 \mod 84923 = 8400 \mod 84923 = 2^4 \cdot 3^1 \cdot 5^2 \cdot 7^1 \mod 84923$$
$$\vdots$$
$$537^2 \mod 84923 = 33600 \mod 84923 = 2^6 \cdot 3^1 \cdot 5^2 \cdot 7^1 \mod 84923$$
$$538^2 \mod 84923 = 34675 \mod 84923 = 5^2 \cdot 19^1 \cdot 73^1 \mod 84923$$

This step continues for all values of z in the range.

- Step 3: Appending v-smooth results
  - If $z^2 \mod 84923$ is 7-smooth, then append its powers to list $B$ and append $z$ to list $Z$.
  - If $B$ has at most $h=4$ elements, return to Step 1. Otherwise, proceed to Step 4.
  - For example, after 537 iterations, we have:

$$Z = \{1, \ldots, 513, 537\}$$
$$B = \{ [0, 0, 0, 0], \ldots, [4, 1, 2, 1], [6, 1, 2, 1] \}$$
and we proceed on to Step 4 since we would have more than $h=4$ vectors in $B$.

- Step 4: This step is split into two parts.
  - Part 1: Finding $B$ modulo 2

$$B =
\begin{pmatrix}
0 & 0 & 0 & 0 \\
4 & 1 & 2 & 1 \\
6 & 1 & 2 & 1
\end{pmatrix}
\mod 2
\equiv
B =
\begin{pmatrix}
0 & 0 & 0 & 0 \\
0 & 1 & 0 & 1 \\
0 & 1 & 0 & 1
\end{pmatrix}$$

- Part 2: Finding a row combination of $B$ that sums to even numbers

For example, summing Row $2$ and Row $3$ gives us a vector of even numbers.

$R_2 = \{0, 1, 0, 1\}$ and $R_3 = \{0, 1, 0, 1\}$

then
$$R_2 + R_3 = \{0, 1, 0, 1\} + \{0, 1, 0, 1\}$$
$$R_2 + R_3 = \{0, 2, 0, 2\}$$.

- Step 5: This step is split into four parts.
  - Part 1: Computing x
    - Multiply the corresponding $z$ values for the rows found in Step 4, mod $n$ to get $x$.

Rows 2 and 3 correspond with 513 and 537, so $x = (513 \cdot 537) = 20712 \mod 84923$

- Part 2: Computing $y$

- Add the rows found in Step 4.
- Divide by 2. (Since these represent exponents, this effectively takes a square root.)
- Apply as exponents to the primes in $P$ to get $y$.
- Return to Step 1 if $x = \pm y$.

Find the half the sum of Rows 2 and 3:
$$\begin{array}{ccccc}
&  4 & 1 & 2 & 1 \\
+ &  6 & 1 & 2 & 1 \\\hline
& 10 & 2 & 4 & 2 \\
\div2 \\\hline
&  5 & 1 & 2 & 1
\end{array}$$
Apply those as exponents to $P=\{2,3,5,7\}$:
$$y = 2^5 \cdot 3^1 \cdot 5^2 \cdot 7^1 = 16800$$

- Since $x \ne \pm y$, we proceed to Part 3.

- Part 3: Computing $x + y$ and $x - y$ where $x = 20712$ and $y = 16800$

$$x + y = 20712 + 16800 = 37512$$
$$x - y = 20712 - 16800 = 3912$$

- Part 4: Computing $\gcd(x+y, n)$ and $\gcd(x-y, n)$ where $n = 84923$, $x+y = 292281$ and $x-y = 258681$

$$\begin{array}{ll}
\gcd(37512, 84923) = 521 \\
\gcd(3912, 84923) = 163
\end{array}$$

Quick check shows $84923 = 521 \cdot 163$.

The pseudocode says to only calculate $x+y$ and return $\gcd(x+y, n)$. This is because it is the faster GCD to compute, and once you have it, dividing $n$ by the result is faster than computing $\gcd(x-y, n)$.

== Optimizations ==
The quadratic sieve is an optimization of Dixon's method. It selects values of x close to the square root of N such that x^{2} modulo N is small, thereby largely increasing the chance of obtaining a smooth number.

Other ways to optimize Dixon's method include using a better algorithm to solve the matrix equation, taking advantage of the sparsity of the matrix: a number z cannot have more than $\log_2 z$ factors, so each row of the matrix is almost all zeros. In practice, the block Lanczos algorithm is often used. Also, the size of the factor base must be chosen carefully: if it is too small, it will be difficult to find numbers that factorize completely over it, and if it is too large, more relations will have to be collected.

A more sophisticated analysis, using the approximation that a number has all its prime factors less than $N^{1/a}$ with probability about $a^{-a}$ (an approximation to the Dickman–de Bruijn function), indicates that choosing too small a factor base is much worse than too large, and that the ideal factor base size is some power of $\exp\left(\sqrt{\log N \log \log N}\right)$.

The optimal complexity of Dixon's method is

$$O\left(\exp\left(2 \sqrt 2 \sqrt{\log n \log \log n}\right)\right)$$

in big-O notation, or

$$L_n [1/2, 2 \sqrt 2]$$

in L-notation.
