= Cipollone =

Cipollone is a surname of Italian origin, a nickname for someone with a big head from the augmentative of the Italian word cipolla meaning "onion". Notable people with the surname include:

- Pat Cipollone (born 1966), American lawyer
- Pete Cipollone (born 1971), American rower
- Piero Cipollone (born 1962), Italian economist and central banker

== See also ==
- Cipolloni
- Cipollina (disambiguation)
- Cipollini (disambiguation)
- Cipollino (disambiguation)
- Chipolin (disambiguation)
- Cipolla (disambiguation)
