= Cipollino (disambiguation) =

Cipollino may refer to:

== Arts and entertainment ==
- Cipollino (Italian: Little Onion), a fictional character from Gianni Rodari's Tale of Cipollino (Italian: Il romanzo di Cipollino)
- Chipollino (film) (Russian: Чиполлино, also released as Cipollino), a 1961 film adaptation of the Tale of Cipollino; see List of animated feature films of the 1960s
- Cipollino, a 1973 ballet by Karen Khachaturian

== Other uses ==
- Cipollino marble (Italian: onion stone), a type of marble popular in antiquity for Greeks and Romans

== See also ==
- Chipolin (disambiguation)
- Cipollina (disambiguation)
- Cipollini (disambiguation)
- Cipollone
- Cipolla (disambiguation)
