= Cipollini =

Cipollini may refer to:

- A small cipolla, the Italian name for onion
- Leopoldia comosa, also called Muscari comosum and tassel hyacinth
- Cipollini (surname)
- Alé–Cipollini, a professional cycling team based in Italy

== See also ==
- Cipollone
- Cipollina (disambiguation)
- Cipollino (disambiguation)
- Chipolin (disambiguation)
- Cipolla (disambiguation)
