= Cipolla =

Cipolla is Italian for onion.

Cipolla may also refer to:

- 11600 Cipolla (1995 SQ2), a main-belt asteroid
- Cipolla (surname)
- Cipolla di Giarratana, a variety of onion
- Cipolla's algorithm

== See also ==
- Cipollone
- Cipollina (disambiguation)
- Cipollini (disambiguation)
- Cipollino (disambiguation)
- Chipolin (disambiguation)
