= Cipollini (surname) =

Cipollini is an Italian surname. Notable people with this name include the following:

- Cesare Cipollini (born 1958), Italian cyclist
- Mario Cipollini (born 1967), Italian cyclist
- Renato Cipollini (1945–2019), Italian footballer
- Joey Cipollini, fictional character in the TV series The Sopranos
