= Euler's criterion =

Formula concerning prime numbers

In number theory, Euler's criterion is a formula for determining whether an integer is a quadratic residue modulo a prime. Precisely,

Let p be an odd prime and a be an integer coprime to p. Then
$$a^{\tfrac{p-1}{2}} \equiv
\begin{cases}
\;\;\,1\pmod{p}& \text{ if there is an integer }x \text{ such that }x^2\equiv a \pmod{p},\\
-1\pmod{p}& \text{ if there is no such integer.}
\end{cases}$$

Euler's criterion can be concisely reformulated using the Legendre symbol:
$$\left(\frac{a}{p}\right) \equiv a^{\tfrac{p-1}{2}} \pmod p.$$

The criterion dates from a 1748 paper by Leonhard Euler.

== Proof ==
The proof uses the fact that the residue classes modulo a prime number are a field. See the article prime field for more details.

Because the modulus is prime, Lagrange's theorem applies: a polynomial of degree k can only have at most k roots. In particular, x^{2} ≡ a (mod p) has at most 2 solutions for each a. This immediately implies that besides 0 there are at least (p − 1)/2 distinct quadratic residues modulo p: each of the p − 1 possible values of x can only be accompanied by one other to give the same residue.

In fact, $(p-x)^{2}\equiv x^{2} \pmod p.$ This is because $(p-x)^{2} \equiv {}$$p^{2}-{2}{x}{p}+x^{2} \equiv {}$$x^{2} \pmod p.$ So, the $\tfrac{p-1}{2}$ distinct quadratic residues are: $1^{2}, 2^{2}, ... , (\tfrac{p-1}{2})^{2} \pmod p.$

As a is coprime to p, Fermat's little theorem says that
$$a^{p-1}\equiv 1 \pmod p,$$
which can be written as
$$\left( a^{\tfrac{p-1}{2}}-1 \right)\left( a^{\tfrac{p-1}{2}}+1 \right)    \equiv 0 \pmod p.$$
Since the integers mod p form a field, for each a, one or the other of these factors must be zero. Therefore,
$$a^{\tfrac{p-1}{2}}\equiv 1\pmod p$$
or
$$a^{\tfrac{p-1}{2}} \equiv {-1}\pmod p.$$

Now if a is a quadratic residue, a ≡ x^{2},
$$a^{\tfrac{p-1}{2}}\equiv {(x^2)}^{\tfrac{p-1}{2}} \equiv x^{p-1}\equiv1\pmod p.$$
So every quadratic residue (mod p) makes the first factor zero.

Applying Lagrange's theorem again, we note that there can be no more than (p − 1)/2 values of a that make the first factor zero. But as we noted at the beginning, there are at least (p − 1)/2 distinct quadratic residues (mod p) (besides 0). Therefore, they are precisely the residue classes that make the first factor zero. The other (p − 1)/2 residue classes, the nonresidues, must make the second factor zero, or they would not satisfy Fermat's little theorem. This is Euler's criterion.

=== Alternative proof ===
This proof only uses the fact that any congruence $kx\equiv l\!\!\! \pmod p$ has a unique (modulo $p$) solution $x$ provided $p$ does not divide $k$. (This is true because as $x$ runs through all nonzero remainders modulo $p$ without repetitions, so does $kx$: if we have $kx_1\equiv kx_2 \pmod p$, then $p\mid k(x_1-x_2)$, hence $p\mid (x_1-x_2)$, but $x_1$ and $x_2$ aren't congruent modulo $p$.) It follows from this fact that all nonzero remainders modulo $p$ the square of which isn't congruent to $a$ can be grouped into unordered pairs $(x,y)$ according to the rule that the product of the members of each pair is congruent to $a$ modulo $p$ (since by this fact for every $y$ we can find such an $x$, uniquely, and vice versa, and they will differ from each other if $y^2$ is not congruent to $a$). If $a$ is not a quadratic residue, this is simply a regrouping of all $p-1$ nonzero residues into $(p-1)/2$ pairs, hence we conclude that $1\cdot2\cdot ... \cdot (p-1)\equiv {}$$a^{\frac{p-1}{2}} \!\!\! \pmod p$. If $a$ is a quadratic residue, exactly two remainders were not among those paired, $r$ and $-r$ such that $r^2\equiv a\!\!\! \pmod p$. If we pair those two absent remainders together, their product will be $-a$ rather than $a$, whence in this case $1\cdot2\cdot ... \cdot (p-1)\equiv {}$$-a^{\frac{p-1}{2}} \!\!\! \pmod p$. In summary, considering these two cases we have demonstrated that for $a\not\equiv 0 \!\!\! \pmod p$ we have $1\cdot2\cdot ... \cdot (p-1)\equiv {}$$-\left(\frac{a}{p}\right)a^{\frac{p-1}{2}} \!\!\! \pmod p$. It remains to substitute $a=1$ (which is obviously a square) into this formula to obtain at once Wilson's theorem, Euler's criterion, and (by squaring both sides of Euler's criterion) Fermat's little theorem.

== Examples ==
Example 1: Finding primes for which a is a residue

Let a = 17. For which primes p is 17 a quadratic residue?

We can test prime p's manually given the formula above.

In one case, testing p = 3, we have 17^{(3 − 1)/2} = 17^{1} ≡ 2 ≡ −1 (mod 3), therefore 17 is not a quadratic residue modulo 3.

In another case, testing p = 13, we have 17^{(13 − 1)/2} = 17^{6} ≡ 1 (mod 13), therefore 17 is a quadratic residue modulo 13. As confirmation, note that 17 ≡ 4 (mod 13), and 2^{2} = 4.

We can do these calculations faster by using various modular arithmetic and Legendre symbol properties.

If we keep calculating the values, we find:

- (17/p) = +1 for p = {13, 19, ...} (17 is a quadratic residue modulo these values)
- (17/p) = −1 for p = {3, 5, 7, 11, 23, ...} (17 is not a quadratic residue modulo these values).

Example 2: Finding residues given a prime modulus p

Which numbers are squares modulo 17 (quadratic residues modulo 17)?

We can manually calculate it as:

- 1^{2} = 1
- 2^{2} = 4
- 3^{2} = 9
- 4^{2} = 16
- 5^{2} = 25 ≡ 8 (mod 17)
- 6^{2} = 36 ≡ 2 (mod 17)
- 7^{2} = 49 ≡ 15 (mod 17)
- 8^{2} = 64 ≡ 13 (mod 17).

So the set of the quadratic residues modulo 17 is {1,2,4,8,9,13,15,16}. Note that we did not need to calculate squares for the values 9 through 16, as they are all negatives of the previously squared values (e.g. 9 ≡ −8 (mod 17), so 9^{2} ≡ (−8)^{2} = 64 ≡ 13 (mod 17)).

We can find quadratic residues or verify them using the above formula. To test if 2 is a quadratic residue modulo 17, we calculate 2^{(17 − 1)/2} = 2^{8} ≡ 1 (mod 17), so it is a quadratic residue. To test if 3 is a quadratic residue modulo 17, we calculate 3^{(17 − 1)/2} = 3^{8} ≡ 16 ≡ −1 (mod 17), so it is not a quadratic residue.

Euler's criterion is related to the law of quadratic reciprocity.

== Applications ==
In practice, it is more efficient to use an extended variant of Euclid's algorithm to calculate the Jacobi symbol $\left(\frac{a}{n}\right)$. If $n$ is an odd prime, this is equal to the Legendre symbol, and decides whether $a$ is a quadratic residue modulo $n$.

On the other hand, since the equivalence of $a^\frac{n-1}{2}$ to the Jacobi symbol holds for all odd primes, but not necessarily for composite numbers, calculating both and comparing them can be used as a primality test, specifically the Solovay–Strassen primality test. Composite numbers for which the congruence holds for a given $a$ are called Euler–Jacobi pseudoprimes to base $a$.
