= Michele Cipolla =

Italian mathematician (1880–1947)

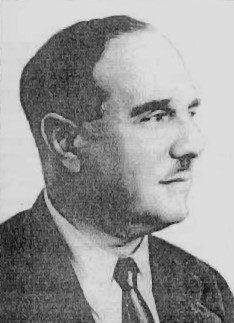

Michele Cipolla (28 October 1880, Palermo – 7 September 1947, Palermo) was an Italian mathematician, mainly specializing in number theory.

He was a professor of Algebraic Analysis at the University of Catania and, later, the University of Palermo. He developed (among other things) a theory for sequences of sets and Cipolla's algorithm for finding square roots modulo a prime number. He also solved the problem of binomial congruence.

== Publications ==
- Opere (Hrsg.: Guido Zappa) Sede della Soc., Palermo 1997. XXXII, 547 S. : Ill. (Supplemento ai Rendiconti del Circolo Matematico di Palermo; Ser. 2, No. 47)
- Storia della matematica dai primordi a Leibniz. Soc. Ed. Siciliana, Mazara 1949. 174 S.

== Literature ==
- Michele Cipolla (1880–1947): la figura e l'opera; convegno celebrativo nel cinquantenario della morte (Palermo, 8 settembre 1997) / / Associazione degli Insegnanti e dei Cultori di Matematica. - Palermo 1998. 156 S.

== See also ==
- Cipolla's algorithm: Method for taking the modular square root for a prime modulus
