= Frank Cipolla (journalist) =

American journalist, author, and businessman

- Born: Frank Cipolla; Queens, New York, U.S.
- Education: St. John's University
- Occupations: Journalist; Author
- Website: www.frankcipolla.tv

Frank Cipolla is an American journalist, author, and businessman.

Cipolla has anchored the news on The Soupy Sales Radio Show, Imus in The Morning Show, and News 12 New Jersey's Morning Edition.

== Early life and education ==
Cipolla was born in Queens, New York and spent his early life there. He attended and graduated from St. John's University.

== Career ==
Cipolla started his career in news at WCRV, a radio station in Washington, Warren County, New Jersey. He then joined WJDM, a radio station in Elizabeth, New Jersey.

In July 1986, he became the anchor newsman on the Soupy Sales Radio Show on WNBC, where he also did news on the Howard Stern and Don Imus shows.

In 1996, he joined News 12 New Jersey. After five years, he moved over to UPN 9 News in New York City, where he worked as a TV reporter and anchor.

In 2011, his memoir, It Shocked Even Us! And More Crazy Stories Covering Local News, was published.

Cipolla has also worked for Staten Island Cable and the Wall Street Journal Radio Network.

== Bibliography ==
- Cipolla, Frank (2011). It Shocked Even Us!
