= Continued fraction factorization =

In number theory, the continued fraction factorization method (CFRAC) is an integer factorization algorithm. It is a general-purpose algorithm, meaning that it is suitable for factoring any integer n, not depending on special form or properties. It was described by D. H. Lehmer and R. E. Powers in 1931, and developed as a computer algorithm by Michael A. Morrison and John Brillhart in 1975.

The continued fraction method is based on Dixon's factorization method. It uses convergents in the regular continued fraction expansion of

$$\sqrt{kn},\qquad k\in\mathbb{Z^+}$$.

Since this is a quadratic irrational, the continued fraction must be periodic (unless n is square, in which case the factorization is obvious).

It has a time complexity of $O\left(e^{\sqrt{2\log n \log\log n}}\right)=L_n\left[1/2,\sqrt{2}\right]$, in the O and L notations.
