= Lagrange's theorem (number theory) =

Theorem in number theory

In number theory, Lagrange's theorem is a statement named after Joseph-Louis Lagrange about how frequently a polynomial over the integers may evaluate to a multiple of a fixed prime p. More precisely, it states that for all integer polynomials $\textstyle f \in \mathbb{Z}[x]$, either:

- every coefficient of f is divisible by p, or
- $p \mid f(x)$ has at most deg f solutions in {1, 2, ..., p},

where deg f is the degree of f.

This can be stated with congruence classes as follows: for all polynomials $\textstyle f \in (\mathbb{Z}/p\mathbb{Z})[x]$ with p prime, either:

- every coefficient of f is null, or
- $f(x)=0$ has at most deg f solutions in $\mathbb{Z}/p\mathbb{Z}$.

If p is not prime, then there can potentially be more than deg f(x) solutions. Consider for example p=8 and the polynomial f(x)=x^{2}−1, where 1, 3, 5, 7 are all solutions.

== Proof ==
Let $\textstyle f \in \mathbb{Z}[x]$ be an integer polynomial, and write g ∈ (Z/pZ)[x] the polynomial obtained by taking its coefficients mod p. Then, for all integers x,

$f(x) \equiv 0 \pmod{p} \quad\Longleftrightarrow\quad g(x) \equiv 0 \pmod{p}$.

Furthermore, by the basic rules of modular arithmetic,

$f(x) \equiv 0 \pmod{p} \quad\Longleftrightarrow\quad f(x \bmod{p}) \equiv 0 \pmod{p} \quad\Longleftrightarrow\quad g(x \bmod{p}) \equiv 0 \pmod{p}$.

Both versions of the theorem (over Z and over Z/pZ) are thus equivalent. We prove the second version by induction on the degree, in the case where the coefficients of f are not all null.

If deg f = 0 then f has no roots and the statement is true.

If deg f ≥ 1 without roots then the statement is also trivially true.

Otherwise, deg f ≥ 1 and f has a root $k\in\mathbb{Z}/p\mathbb{Z}$. The fact that Z/pZ is a field allows to apply the division algorithm to f and the polynomial x − k (of degree 1), which yields the existence of a polynomial $\textstyle g \in (\mathbb{Z}/p\mathbb{Z})[x]$ (of degree lower than that of f) and of a constant $\textstyle r \in \mathbb{Z}/p\mathbb{Z}$ (of degree lower than 1) such that

$f(x) = g(x) (x-k) + r.$

Evaluating at x = k provides r = 0. The other roots of f are then roots of g as well, which by the induction property are at most deg g ≤ deg f − 1 in number. This proves the result.

== Generalization ==
Let p(X) be a polynomial over an integral domain R with degree n > 0. Then the polynomial equation p(x) = 0 has at most n = deg(p(X)) roots in R.
