= Cipollina =

Cipollina is Italian for chives.

Cipollina may also refer to:

== People ==
- Adriano Cipollina, Belgian soccer player who entered free agency in 2018; see List of Belgian football transfers summer 2018
- Amara Cipollina, French gymnast and bronze medallist at the 2014 18th Tournoi International
- Jean Cipollina (1903–1981), Italian Olympic rower
- John Cipollina (1943–1989), U.S. guitarist
- Mario Cipollina, U.S. guitarist

== Places ==
- Cipollina, subdivision of Ronco Scrivia, Genoa, Liguria, Italy
- Cascina Cipollina (Italian: Cipollina Farmhouse), subdivision of Carbonate, Lombardy, Italy

== See also ==
- Cipollone
- Cipollini (disambiguation)
- Cipollino (disambiguation)
- Chipolin (disambiguation)
- Cipolla (disambiguation)
