= Discrete logarithm records =

Best results achieved to date

Discrete logarithm records are the best results achieved to date in solving the discrete logarithm problem, which is the problem of finding solutions $x$ to the equation $g^x = h$ given elements $g$ and $h$ of a finite cyclic group $G$. The difficulty of this problem is the basis for the security of several cryptographic systems, including Diffie–Hellman key agreement, ElGamal encryption, the ElGamal signature scheme, the Digital Signature Algorithm, and the elliptic curve cryptography analogues of these. Common choices for $G$ used in these algorithms include the multiplicative group of integers modulo $p$, the multiplicative group of a finite field, and the group of points on an elliptic curve over a finite field.

== Integers modulo p ==
The current record for integers modulo prime numbers, set in December 2019, is a discrete logarithm computation modulo a prime with 240 digits. For characteristic 2, the current record for finite fields, set in July 2019, is a discrete logarithm over $\mathrm{GF}(2^{30750})$. When restricted to prime exponents, the current record, set in October 2014, is over $\mathrm{GF}(2^{1279})$. For characteristic 3, the current record, set in July 2016, is over $\mathrm{GF}(3^{6*509})$. For Kummer extension fields of "moderate" characteristic, the current record, set in January 2013, is over $\mathrm{GF}(33341353^{57})$. For fields of "moderate" characteristic (which are not necessarily Kummer extensions), the current record, published in 2022, is over $\mathrm {GF} (2111023^{50})$.

Previous records for integers modulo p include:

- On 2 Dec 2019, Fabrice Boudot, Pierrick Gaudry, Aurore Guillevic, Nadia Heninger, Emmanuel Thomé, and Paul Zimmermann announced the computation of a discrete logarithm modulo the 240-digit (795 bit) prime RSA-240 + 49204 (the first safe prime above RSA-240). This computation was performed simultaneously with the factorization of RSA-240, using the Number Field Sieve algorithm and the open-source CADO-NFS software. The discrete logarithm part of the computation took approximately 3100 core-years, using Intel Xeon Gold 6130 CPUs as a reference (2.1 GHz). The researchers estimate that improvements in the algorithms and software made this computation three times faster than would be expected from previous records after accounting for improvements in hardware.
- On 16 June 2016, Thorsten Kleinjung, Claus Diem, Arjen K. Lenstra, Christine Priplata, and Colin Stahlke announced the computation of a discrete logarithm modulo a 232-digit (768-bit) safe prime, using the number field sieve. The computation was started in February 2015 and took approximately 6600 core years scaled to an Intel Xeon E5-2660 at 2.2 GHz.
- On 18 June 2005, Antoine Joux and Reynald Lercier announced the computation of a discrete logarithm modulo a 130-digit (431-bit) strong prime in three weeks, using a 1.15 GHz 16-processor HP AlphaServer GS1280 computer and a number field sieve algorithm.
- On 5 February 2007 this was superseded by the announcement by Thorsten Kleinjung of the computation of a discrete logarithm modulo a 160-digit (530-bit) safe prime, again using the number field sieve. Most of the computation was done using idle time on various PCs and on a parallel computing cluster.
- On 11 June 2014, Cyril Bouvier, Pierrick Gaudry, Laurent Imbert, Hamza Jeljeli and Emmanuel Thomé announced the computation of a discrete logarithm modulo a 180 digit (596-bit) safe prime using the number field sieve algorithm.

Also of note, in July 2016, Joshua Fried, Pierrick Gaudry, Nadia Heninger, Emmanuel Thome published their discrete logarithm computation on a 1024-bit prime. They generated a prime susceptible to the special number field sieve, using the specialized algorithm on a comparatively small subgroup (160-bits). While this is a small subgroup, it was the standardized subgroup size used with the 1024-bit digital signature algorithm (DSA).

Discrete logarithm records modulo primes
Size of prime	Type of prime	Date announced	Announced by	Algorithm	Hardware	Notes
240-digit (795-bit)	safe prime	2 December 2019	Fabrice Boudot; Pierrick Gaudry; Aurore Guillevic; Nadia Heninger; Emmanuel Thomé; Paul Zimmermann	number field sieve		The prime used was RSA-240 + 49204 (the first safe prime above RSA-240). This computation was performed simultaneously with the factorization of RSA-240, using the Number Field Sieve algorithm and the open-source CADO-NFS software. Improvements in the algorithms and software made this computation about three times faster than would be expected from previous records after accounting for improvements in hardware. A paper providing details on the method was published in 2020. The code required to reproduce this result is available at https://gitlab.inria.fr/cado-nfs/records/-/blob/master/dlp240/README.md.
1024-bit		July 2016	Joshua Fried; Pierrick Gaudry; Nadia Heninger; Emmanuel Thome	special number field sieve		The researchers generated a prime susceptible to the special number field sieve using a specialized algorithm on a comparatively small subgroup (160-bits).
232-digit (768-bit)	safe prime	16 June 2016	Thorsten Kleinjung; Claus Diem; Arjen K. Lenstra; Christine Priplata; Colin Stahlke	number field sieve		This computation started in February 2015.
180 digit (596-bit)	safe prime	11 June 2014	Cyril Bouvier; Pierrick Gaudry; Laurent Imbert; Hamza Jeljeli; Emmanuel Thomé	number field sieve		
160-digit (530-bit)	safe prime	5 February 2007	Thorsten Kleinjung	number field sieve	various PCs, a parallel computing cluster	
130-digit (431-bit)	strong prime	18 June 2005	Antoine Joux; Reynald Lercier	number field sieve	1.15 GHz 16-processor HP AlphaServer GS1280	

== Finite fields ==
The current record (as of July 2019) in a finite field of characteristic 2 was announced by Robert Granger, Thorsten Kleinjung, Arjen Lenstra, Benjamin Wesolowski, and Jens Zumbrägel on 10 July 2019. This team was able to compute discrete logarithms in GF(2^{30750}) using 25,481,219 core hours on clusters based on the Intel Xeon architecture. This computation was the first large-scale example using the elimination step of the quasi-polynomial algorithm.

Previous records in a finite field of characteristic 2 were announced by:

- Robert Granger, Thorsten Kleinjung, and Jens Zumbrägel on 31 January 2014. This team was able to compute discrete logarithms in GF(2^{9234}) using about 400,000 core hours. New features of this computation include a modified method for obtaining the logarithms of degree two elements and a systematically optimized descent strategy.
- Antoine Joux on 21 May 2013. His team was able to compute discrete logarithms in the field with 2^{6168} = (2^{257})^{24} elements using less than 550 CPU-hours. This computation was performed using the same index calculus algorithm as in the recent computation in the field with 2^{4080} elements.
- Robert Granger, Faruk Göloğlu, Gary McGuire, and Jens Zumbrägel on 11 Apr 2013. The new computation concerned the field with 2^{6120} elements and took 749.5 core-hours.
- Antoine Joux on 22 March 2013. This used the same algorithm for small characteristic fields as the previous computation in the field with 2^{1778} elements. The new computation concerned the field with 2^{4080} elements, represented as a degree 255 extension of the field with 2^{16} elements. The computation took less than 14100 core hours.
- Robert Granger, Faruk Göloğlu, Gary McGuire, and Jens Zumbrägel on 19 Feb 2013. They used a new variant of the medium-sized base field function field sieve, for binary fields, to compute a discrete logarithm in a field of 2^{1971} elements. In order to use a medium-sized base field, they represented the field as a degree 73 extension of the field of 2^{27} elements. The computation took 3132 core hours on an SGI Altix ICE 8200EX cluster using Intel (Westmere) Xeon E5650 hex-core processors.
- Antoine Joux on 11 Feb 2013. This used a new algorithm for small characteristic fields. The computation concerned a field of 2^{1778} elements, represented as a degree 127 extension of the field with 2^{14} elements. The computation took less than 220 core hours.

The current record (as of 2014) in a finite field of characteristic 2 of prime degree was announced by Thorsten Kleinjung on 17 October 2014. The calculation was done in a field of 2^{1279} elements and followed essentially the path sketched for $\mathrm{GF}(2^{4 \cdot 1223})$ in with two main exceptions in the linear algebra computation and the descent phase. The total running time was less than four core years. The previous record in a finite field of characteristic 2 of prime degree was announced by the CARAMEL group on 6 April 2013. They used the function field sieve to compute a discrete logarithm in a field of 2^{809} elements.

The current record (as of July 2016) for a field of characteristic 3 was announced by Gora Adj, Isaac Canales-Martinez, Nareli Cruz-Cortés, Alfred Menezes, Thomaz Oliveira, Francisco Rodriguez-Henriquez, and Luis Rivera-Zamarripa on 18 July 2016. The calculation was done in the 4841-bit finite field with 3^{6 · 509} elements and was performed on several computers at CINVESTAV and the University of Waterloo. In total, about 200 core years of computing time was expended on the computation.

Previous records in a finite field of characteristic 3 were announced:

- in the full version of the Asiacrypt 2014 paper of Joux and Pierrot (December 2014). The DLP is solved in the field GF(3^{5 · 479}), which is a 3796-bit field. This work did not exploit any "special" aspects of the field such as Kummer or twisted-Kummer properties. The total computation took less than 8600 CPU-hours.
- by Gora Adj, Alfred Menezes, Thomaz Oliveira, and Francisco Rodríguez-Henríquez on 26 February 2014, updating a previous announcement on 27 January 2014. The computation solve DLP in the 1551-bit field GF(3^{6 · 163}), taking 1201 CPU hours.
- in 2012 by a joint Fujitsu, NICT, and Kyushu University team, that computed a discrete logarithm in the field of 3^{6 · 97} elements and a size of 923 bits, using a variation on the function field sieve and beating the previous record in a field of 3^{6 · 71} elements and size of 676 bits by a wide margin.

Over fields of "moderate"-sized characteristic, notable computations as of 2005 included those a field of 65537^{25} elements (401 bits) announced on 24 Oct 2005, and in a field of 370801^{30} elements (556 bits) announced on 9 Nov 2005. The current record (as of 2013) for a Kummer extension finite field of "moderate" characteristic was announced on 6 January 2013. The team used a new variation of the function field sieve for the medium prime case to compute a discrete logarithm in a Kummer extension field of 33341353^{57} elements (a 1425-bit finite field). The same technique had been used a few weeks earlier to compute a discrete logarithm in a Kummer extension field of 33553771^{47} elements (an 1175-bit finite field). The current record (as of 2022) for a finite field of "moderate" characteristic (which is not necessarily a Kummer extension) is the computation of discrete logarithm in a field of 2111023^{50} elements (a 1051-bit finite field); previous record of discrete logarithm computations over such fields was over fields having 297079^{40} elements (a 728-bit finite field) and 64373^{37} elements (a 592-bit finite field). These computations were done using new ideas to speed up the function field sieve.

On 25 June 2014, Razvan Barbulescu, Pierrick Gaudry, Aurore Guillevic, and François Morain announced a new computation of a discrete logarithm in a finite field whose order has 160 digits and is a degree 2 extension of a prime field. The algorithm used was the number field sieve (NFS), with various modifications. The total computing time was equivalent to 68 days on one core of CPU (sieving) and 30 hours on a GPU (linear algebra).

Discrete logarithm records over finite fields
Char.	Field size	Date announced	Announced by	Hardware	Compute	Notes
2	2^{30750}	10 July 2019	Robert Granger; Thorsten Kleinjung; Arjen Lenstra; Benjamin Wesolowski; Jens Zumbrägel	Intel Xeon architecture	25,481,219 core-hours	This computation was the first large-scale example using the elimination step of the quasi-polynomial algorithm.
2	2^{1279}	17 October 2014	Thorsten Kleinjung		<4 core-years	
2	2^{9234}	31 January 2014	Robert Granger; Thorsten Kleinjung; Jens Zumbrägel		~400,000 core-hours	New features of this computation include a modified method for obtaining the logarithms of degree two elements and a systematically optimized descent strategy.
2	2^{6168}	21 May 2013	Antoine Joux		<550 CPU-hours	
2	2^{6120}	11 April 2013	Robert Granger; Faruk Göloğlu; Gary McGuire; Jens Zumbrägel		749.5 core-hours	
2	2^{809}	6 April 2013	the CARAMEL group			
2	2^{4080}	22 March 2013	Antoine Joux		<14,100 core-hours	
2	2^{1971}	19 February 2013	Robert Granger; Faruk Göloğlu; Gary McGuire; Jens Zumbrägel	SGI Altix ICE 8200EX cluster Intel (Westmere) Xeon E5650 hex-core processors	3,132 core-hours	
2	2^{1778}	11 February 2013	Antoine Joux		<220 core-hours	
3	3^{6 · 509}	18 July 2016	Gora Adj; Isaac Canales-Martinez; Nareli Cruz-Cortés; Alfred Menezes; Thomaz Oliveira; Francisco Rodriguez-Henriquez; Luis Rivera-Zamarripa	several computers at CINVESTAV and the University of Waterloo	~200 core-years	
3	3^{5 · 479}	December 2014	Antoine Joux; Cécile Pierrot		<8600 CPU-hours	
3	3^{6 · 163}	27 January 2014	Gora Adj; Alfred Menezes; Thomaz Oliveira; Francisco Rodríguez-Henríquez		1201 CPU-hours	
3	3^{6 · 97}	2012	a joint Fujitsu, NICT, and Kyushu University team			
3	3^{6 · 71}					
"moderate"	p^{2}	25 June 2014	Razvan Barbulescu; Pierrick Gaudry; Aurore Guillevic; François Morain		68 CPU-days + 30 GPU-hours	This field is a degree-2 extension of a prime field, where p is a prime with 80 digits.
"moderate"	33341353^{57}	6 January 2013				
"moderate"	33553771^{47}					
"moderate"	370801^{30}	9 November 2005				
"moderate"	65537^{25}	24 October 2005				

== Elliptic curves ==
Certicom Corp. has issued a series of Elliptic Curve Cryptography challenges. Level I involves fields of 109-bit and 131-bit sizes. Level II includes 163, 191, 239, 359-bit sizes. All Level II challenges are currently believed to be computationally infeasible.

The Level I challenges which have been met are:

- ECC2K-108, involving taking a discrete logarithm on a Koblitz curve over a field of 2^{108} elements. The prize was awarded on 4 April 2000 to a group of about 1300 people represented by Robert Harley. They used a parallelized Pollard rho method with speedup.
- ECC2-109, involving taking a discrete logarithm on a curve over a field of 2^{109} elements. The prize was awarded on 8 April 2004 to a group of about 2600 people represented by Chris Monico. They also used a version of a parallelized Pollard rho method, taking 17 months of calendar time.
- ECCp-109, involving taking a discrete logarithm on a curve modulo a 109-bit prime. The prize was awarded on 15 Apr 2002 to a group of about 10308 people represented by Chris Monico. Once again, they used a version of a parallelized Pollard rho method, taking 549 days of calendar time.

None of the 131-bit (or larger) challenges have been met as of 2026.

In July 2009, Joppe W. Bos, Marcelo E. Kaihara, Thorsten Kleinjung, Arjen K. Lenstra and Peter L. Montgomery announced that they had carried out a discrete logarithm computation on an elliptic curve (known as secp112r1) modulo a 112-bit prime. The computation was done on a cluster of over 200 PlayStation 3 game consoles over about 6 months. They used the common parallelized version of Pollard rho method.

In April 2014, Erich Wenger and Paul Wolfger from Graz University of Technology solved the discrete logarithm of a 113-bit Koblitz curve in extrapolated (Note: The computation ran for 47 days, but not all of the FPGAs used were active all the time, which meant that it was equivalent to an extrapolated time of 24 days.) 24 days using an 18-core Virtex-6 FPGA cluster. In January 2015, the same researchers solved the discrete logarithm of an elliptic curve defined over a 113-bit binary field. The average runtime is around 82 days using a 10-core Kintex-7 FPGA cluster.

On 2 December 2016, Daniel J. Bernstein, Susanne Engels, Tanja Lange, Ruben Niederhagen, Christof Paar, Peter Schwabe, and Ralf Zimmermann announced the solution of a generic 117.35-bit elliptic curve discrete logarithm problem on a binary curve, using an optimized FPGA implementation of a parallel version of Pollard's rho method. The attack ran for about six months on 64 to 576 FPGAs in parallel.

On 23 August 2017, Takuya Kusaka, Sho Joichi, Ken Ikuta, Md. Al-Amin Khandaker, Yasuyuki Nogami, Satoshi Uehara, Nariyoshi Yamai, and Sylvain Duquesne announced that they had solved a discrete logarithm problem on a 114-bit "pairing-friendly" Barreto–Naehrig (BN) curve, using the special sextic twist property of the BN curve to efficiently carry out the random walk of Pollard's rho method. The implementation used 2000 CPU cores and took about 6 months to solve the problem.

On 16 June 2020, Aleksander Zieniewicz (zielar) and Jean Luc Pons (JeanLucPons) announced the solution of a 114-bit interval elliptic curve discrete logarithm problem on the secp256k1 curve by solving a 114-bit private key in Bitcoin Puzzle Transactions Challenge. To set a new record, they used their own software based on the Pollard Kangaroo on 256x NVIDIA Tesla V100 GPU processor and it took them 13 days. Two weeks earlier - They used the same number of graphics cards to solve a 109-bit interval ECDLP in just 3 days.

Discrete logarithm records for elliptic curves
Curve name	Field size	Date announced	Announced by	Algorithm	Compute time
ECC2K-108	2^{108}	2000	about 1300 people represented by Robert Harley	Pollard rho method	
ECCp-109	109-bit prime	2002	about 10308 people represented by Chris Monico	parallelized Pollard rho method	549 days
ECC2-109	2^{109}	2004	about 2600 people represented by Chris Monico	parallelized Pollard rho method	17 months
secp112r1	112-bit prime	July 2009	Joppe W. Bos; Marcelo E. Kaihara; Thorsten Kleinjung; Arjen K. Lenstra; Peter L. Montgomery	the common parallelized version of Pollard rho method	6 months
	2^{113}	April 2014	Erich Wenger; Paul Wolfger		47 days
	2^{113}	January 2015	Erich Wenger; Paul Wolfger		82 days
	2^{127} Interval search size 2^{117.35}	2 December 2016	Daniel J. Bernstein; Susanne Engels; Tanja Lange; Ruben Niederhagen; Christof Paar; Peter Schwabe; Ralf Zimmermann	parallel version of Pollard's rho method	6 months of 64 to 576 FPGAs
Barreto–Naehrig Pairing friendly curve	114-bit prime	23 August 2017	Takuya Kusaka; Sho Joichi; Ken Ikuta; Md. Al-Amin Khandaker; Yasuyuki Nogami; Satoshi Uehara; Nariyoshi Yamai; Sylvain Duquesne	parallel version of Pollard's rho method on twisted BN curve	6 months using 2000 CPU
secp256k1	256-bit prime Interval search size 2^{114}	16 August 2020	Aleksander Zieniewicz; Jean Luc Pons	parallel version of Pollard's rho method	13 Days on 256xTesla V100
