= RSA Factoring Challenge =

Challenge for factoring large semiprimes

The RSA Factoring Challenge was a challenge put forward by RSA Laboratories on March 18, 1991 to encourage research into computational number theory and the practical difficulty of factoring large integers and cracking RSA keys used in cryptography. They published a list of semiprimes (numbers with exactly two prime factors) known as the RSA numbers, with a cash prize for the successful factorization of some of them. The smallest of them, a 100-decimal digit number called RSA-100 was factored by April 1, 1991. Many of the bigger numbers have still not been factored and are expected to remain unfactored for quite some time, however advances in quantum computers make this prediction uncertain due to Shor's algorithm.

In 2001, RSA Laboratories expanded the factoring challenge and offered prizes ranging from $10,000 to $200,000 for factoring numbers from 576 bits up to 2048 bits.

The RSA Factoring Challenges ended in 2007. RSA Laboratories stated: "Now that the industry has a considerably more advanced understanding of the cryptanalytic strength of common symmetric-key and public-key algorithms, these challenges are no longer active." When the challenge ended in 2007, only RSA-576 and RSA-640 had been factored from the 2001 challenge numbers.

The factoring challenge was intended to track the cutting edge in integer factorization. A primary application is for choosing the key length of the RSA public-key encryption scheme. Progress in this challenge should give an insight into which key sizes are still safe and for how long. As RSA Laboratories is a provider of RSA-based products, the challenge was used by them as an incentive for the academic community to attack the core of their solutions — in order to prove its strength.

The RSA numbers were generated on a computer with no network connection of any kind. The computer's hard drive was subsequently destroyed so that no record would exist, anywhere, of the solution to the factoring challenge.

The first RSA numbers generated, RSA-100 to RSA-500 and RSA-617, were labeled according to their number of decimal digits; the other RSA numbers (beginning with RSA-576) were generated later and labelled according to their number of binary digits. The numbers in the table below are listed in increasing order despite this shift from decimal to binary.

== The mathematics ==
RSA Laboratories states that: for each RSA number n, there exist prime numbers p and q such that

n = p × q.

The problem is to find these two primes, given only n.

== The prizes and records ==
The following table gives an overview over all RSA numbers. Note that the RSA Factoring Challenge ended in 2007 and no further prizes will be awarded for factoring the higher numbers.

The challenge numbers in white lines are part of the original challenge and are expressed in base 10, while the challenge numbers in yellow lines are part of the 2001 expansion and are expressed in base 2

RSA number	Decimal digits	Binary digits	Cash prize offered	Factored on	Factored by
RSA-100	100	330	US$1,000	April 1, 1991	Arjen K. Lenstra
RSA-110	110	364	US$4,429	April 14, 1992	Arjen K. Lenstra and M.S. Manasse
RSA-120	120	397	US$5,898	July 9, 1993	T. Denny et al.
RSA-129 (Note: RSA-129 was not part of the RSA Factoring Challenge, but was related to a column by Martin Gardner in Scientific American.)	129	426	US$100	April 26, 1994	Arjen K. Lenstra et al.
RSA-130	130	430	US$14,527	April 10, 1996	Arjen K. Lenstra et al.
RSA-140	140	463	US$17,226	February 2, 1999	Herman te Riele et al.
RSA-150	150	496		April 16, 2004	Kazumaro Aoki et al.
RSA-155	155	512	US$9,383	August 22, 1999	Herman te Riele et al.
RSA-160	160	530		April 1, 2003	Jens Franke et al., University of Bonn
RSA-170 (Note: The number was factored after the challenge ended.)	170	563		December 29, 2009	D. Bonenberger and M. Krone (Note: RSA-170 was also independently factored by S. A. Danilov and I. A. Popovyan two days later.)
RSA-576	174	576	US$10,000	December 3, 2003	Jens Franke et al., University of Bonn
RSA-180	180	596		May 8, 2010	S. A. Danilov and I. A. Popovyan, Moscow State University
RSA-190	190	629		November 8, 2010	A. Timofeev and I. A. Popovyan
RSA-640	193	640	US$20,000	November 2, 2005	Jens Franke et al., University of Bonn
RSA-200	200	663		May 9, 2005	Jens Franke et al., University of Bonn
RSA-210	210	696		September 26, 2013	Ryan Propper
RSA-704	212	704	US$30,000	July 2, 2012	Shi Bai, Emmanuel Thomé and Paul Zimmermann
RSA-220	220	729		May 13, 2016	S. Bai, P. Gaudry, A. Kruppa, E. Thomé and P. Zimmermann
RSA-230	230	762		August 15, 2018	Samuel S. Gross, Noblis, Inc.
RSA-232	232	768		February 17, 2020	N. L. Zamarashkin, D. A. Zheltkov and S. A. Matveev.
RSA-768	232	768	US$50,000	December 12, 2009	Thorsten Kleinjung et al.
RSA-240	240	795		December 2, 2019	F. Boudot, P. Gaudry, A. Guillevic, N. Heninger, E. Thomé and P. Zimmermann
RSA-250	250	829		February 28, 2020	F. Boudot, P. Gaudry, A. Guillevic, N. Heninger, E. Thomé and P. Zimmermann
RSA-260	260	862		September 3, 2026	Eric Lu, Cognition
RSA-270	270	895		November 12, 2026	Eric Lu, Cognition
RSA-896	270	896	~~US$75,000~~ (Note: The challenge ended before this prize was awarded.)	September 19, 2026	Stephen A. Weis
RSA-280	280	928			
RSA-290	290	962			
RSA-300	300	995			
RSA-309	309	1024			
RSA-1024	309	1024	~~US$100,000~~		
RSA-310	310	1028			
RSA-320	320	1061			
RSA-330	330	1094			
RSA-340	340	1128			
RSA-350	350	1161			
RSA-360	360	1194			
RSA-370	370	1227			
RSA-380	380	1261			
RSA-390	390	1294			
RSA-400	400	1327			
RSA-410	410	1360			
RSA-420	420	1393			
RSA-430	430	1427			
RSA-440	440	1460			
RSA-450	450	1493			
RSA-460	460	1526			
RSA-1536	463	1536	~~US$150,000~~		
RSA-470	470	1559			
RSA-480	480	1593			
RSA-490	490	1626			
RSA-500	500	1659			
RSA-617	617	2048			
RSA-2048	617	2048	~~US$200,000~~		

== See also ==
- RSA numbers, decimal expansions of the numbers and known factorizations
- LCS35
- The Magic Words are Squeamish Ossifrage, the solution found in 1993 to another RSA challenge posed in 1977
- RSA Secret-Key Challenge
- Integer factorization records
- Jevon's number
