= RSA numbers =

Set of large semiprimes

In mathematics, the RSA numbers are a set of large semiprimes (numbers with exactly two prime factors) that were part of the RSA Factoring Challenge. The challenge was to find the prime factors of each number. It was created by RSA Laboratories in March 1991 to encourage research into computational number theory and the practical difficulty of factoring large integers. The challenge was ended in 2007.

== History ==
RSA Laboratories (which is an initialism of the creators of the technique, Rivest, Shamir and Adleman) published a number of semiprimes with 100 to 617 decimal digits. Cash prizes of varying size, up to US$200,000 (and prizes up to $20,000 awarded), were offered for factorization of some of them. The smallest RSA number was factored in a few days. Most of the numbers have still not been factored and many of them are expected to remain unfactored for many years to come.

As of November 2026, the smallest 26 of the 54 listed numbers have been factored.

While the RSA challenge officially ended in 2007, people are still attempting to find the factorizations. According to RSA Laboratories, "Now that the industry has a considerably more advanced understanding of the cryptanalytic strength of common symmetric-key and public-key algorithms, these challenges are no longer active." Some of the smaller prizes had been awarded at the time. The remaining prizes were retracted.

The first RSA numbers generated, from RSA-100 to RSA-500, were labeled according to their number of decimal digits. Later, beginning with RSA-576, binary digits are counted instead. An exception to this is RSA-617, which was created before the change in the numbering scheme. The numbers (sequence A391940 in the OEIS) are listed in increasing order below.

== Overview ==
Rank	Name	Digits	Bits	Factor date
1	RSA-100	100	330	1991-04-01
2	RSA-110	110	364	1992-04
3	RSA-120	120	397	1993-06
4	RSA-129	129	426	1994-04
5	RSA-130	130	430	1996-04-10
6	RSA-140	140	463	1999-02-02
7	RSA-150	150	496	2004
8	RSA-155	155	512	1999-08-22
9	RSA-160	160	530	2003-04-01
10	RSA-170	170	563	2009-12-29
11	RSA-576	174	576	2003-12-03
12	RSA-180	180	596	2010-05-08
13	RSA-190	190	629	2010-11-08
14	RSA-640	193	640	2005-11-02
15	RSA-200	200	663	2005-05-09
16	RSA-210	210	696	2013-09
17	RSA-704	212	704	2012-07-02
18	RSA-220	220	729	2016-05-13
19	RSA-230	230	762	2018-08-15
20	RSA-232	232	768	2020-02-17
21	RSA-768	232	768	2009-12-12
22	RSA-240	240	795	2019-11
23	RSA-250	250	829	2020-02-28
24	RSA-260	260	862	2026-09-03
25	RSA-270	270	895	2026-11-12
26	RSA-896	270	896	2026-09-19
27	RSA-280	280	928	
28	RSA-290	290	962	
29	RSA-300	300	995	
30	RSA-309	309	1,024	
31	RSA-1024	309	1,024	
32	RSA-310	310	1,028	
33	RSA-320	320	1,061	
34	RSA-330	330	1,094	
35	RSA-340	340	1,128	
36	RSA-350	350	1,161	
37	RSA-360	360	1,194	
38	RSA-370	370	1,227	
39	RSA-380	380	1,261	
40	RSA-390	390	1,294	
41	RSA-400	400	1,327	
42	RSA-410	410	1,360	
43	RSA-420	420	1,393	
44	RSA-430	430	1,427	
45	RSA-440	440	1,460	
46	RSA-450	450	1,493	
47	RSA-460	460	1,526	
48	RSA-1536	463	1,536	
49	RSA-470	470	1,559	
50	RSA-480	480	1,593	
51	RSA-490	490	1,626	
52	RSA-500	500	1,659	
53	RSA-617	617	2,048	
54	RSA-2048	617	2,048	

== Table of solved RSA numbers ==
First solver
	date	algorithm	compute power	calendar time
RSA-100	1991-04-01	ppmpqs by Mark Manasse and Arjen K. Lenstra	approx. 7 MIP-Years	
RSA-110	1992-04-14	ppmpqs by Arjen K. Lenstra	one month on 5/8 of a 16K MasPar	
RSA-120	1993-06-09	ppmpqs	835 mips years run by Arjen K. Lenstra (45.503%), Bruce Dodson (30.271%), Thomas Denny (22.516%), Mark Manasse (1.658%), and Walter Lioen and Herman te Riele (0.049%)	
RSA-129	1994-04-26	ppmpqs	approximately 5000 mips years run by Derek Atkins, Michael Graff, Arjen K. Lenstra, Paul Leyland, and more than 600 volunteers	
RSA-130	1996-04-10	General Number Field Sieve with lattice sieving implementations by Bellcore, CWI, and Saarbruecken; and blocked Lanczos and square root by Peter L. Montgomery	sieving: estimated 500 mips years, run by Bruce Dodson (28.37%), Peter L. Montgomery and Marije Elkenbracht-Huizing (27.77%), Arjen K. Lenstra (19.11%), WWW contributors (17.17%), Matt Fante (4.36%), Paul Leyland (1.66%), Damian Weber and Joerg Zayer (1.56%) matrix (67.5 hours on the Cray-C90 at SARA, Amsterdam) and square root (48 hours per dependency on an SGI Challenge processor) run by Peter L. Montgomery and Marije Elkenbracht-Huizing	
RSA-140	1999-02-02	GNFS with line (by CWI; 45%) and lattice (by Arjen K. Lenstra; 55%) sieving, and a polynomial selection method by Brian Murphy and Peter L. Montgomery; and blocked Lanczos and square root by Peter L. Montgomery	polynomial selection: 2000 CPU hours on four 250 MHZ SGI Origin 2000 processors at CWI sieving: 8.9 CPU-years on about 125 SGI and Sun workstations running at 175 MHZ on average, and on about 60 PCs running at 300 MHZ on average; approximately equivalent to 1500 mips years; run by Peter L. Montgomery, Stefania Cavallar, Herman J.J. te Riele, and Walter M. Lioen (36.8%), Paul Leyland (28.8%), Bruce Dodson (26.6%), Paul Zimmermann (5.4%), and Arjen K. Lenstra (2.5%). matrix: 100 hours on the Cray-C916 at SARA, Amsterdam square root: four different dependencies were run in parallel on four 250 MHZ SGI Origin 2000 processors at CWI; three of them found the factors of RSA-140 after 14.2, 19.0 and 19.0 CPU-hours	eleven weeks (including four weeks for polynomial selection, one month for sieving, one week for data filtering and matrix construction, five days for the matrix, and 14.2 hours to find the factors using the square root)
RSA-155	1999-08-22	GNFS with line (29%) and lattice (71%) sieving, and a polynomial selection method written by Brian Murphy and Peter L. Montgomery, ported by Arjen Lenstra to use his multiple precision arithmetic code (LIP); and blocked Lanczos and square root by Peter L. Montgomery	polynomial selection run by Brian Murphy, Peter Montgomery, Arjen Lenstra and Bruce Dodson; Dodson found the one that was used sieving: 35.7 CPU-years in total, on about one hundred and sixty 175-400 MHz SGI and Sun workstations, eight 250 MHz SGI Origin 2000 processors, one hundred and twenty 300-450 MHz Pentium II PCs, and four 500 MHz Digital/Compaq boxes; approximately equivalent to 8000 mips years; run by Alec Muffett (20.1% of relations, 3057 CPU days), Paul Leyland (17.5%, 2092 CPU days), Peter L. Montgomery and Stefania Cavallar (14.6%, 1819 CPU days), Bruce Dodson (13.6%, 2222 CPU days), Francois Morain and Gerard Guillerm (13.0%, 1801 CPU days), Joel Marchand (6.4%, 576 CPU days), Arjen K. Lenstra (5.0%, 737 CPU days), Paul Zimmermann (4.5%, 252 CPU days), Jeff Gilchrist (4.0%, 366 CPU days), Karen Aardal (0.65%, 62 CPU days), and Chris and Craig Putnam (0.56%, 47 CPU days) matrix: 224 hours on one CPU of the Cray-C916 at SARA, Amsterdam square root: four 300 MHz R12000 processors of a 24-processor SGI Origin 2000 at CWI; the successful one took 39.4 CPU-hours and the others took 38.3, 41.9, and 61.6 CPU-hours	9 weeks for polynomial selection, plus 5.2 months for the rest (including 3.7 months for sieving, about 1 month for data filtering and matrix construction, and 10 days for the matrix)

== Solved individual RSA numbers ==
=== RSA-100 ===
RSA-100 has 100 decimal digits (330 bits). Its factorization was announced on April 1, 1991, by Arjen K. Lenstra. Reportedly, the factorization took a few days using the multiple-polynomial quadratic sieve algorithm on a MasPar parallel computer.

The value and factorization of RSA-100 are as follows:

RSA-100 = 1522605027922533360535618378132637429718068114961380688657908494580122963258952897654000350692006139

RSA-100 = 37975227936943673922808872755445627854565536638199
        × 40094690950920881030683735292761468389214899724061

RSA-100 is often used to benchmark new factorization software or new hardware.

As of December 2009, it took four hours to repeat this factorization using the program Msieve on a 2200 MHz Athlon 64 processor.

As of June 2015, the number could be factorized in 72 minutes on overclocked to 3.5 GHz Intel Core2 Quad q9300, using GGNFS and Msieve binaries running by distributed version of the factmsieve Perl script.

As of June 2025, the number was factored in 108 seconds on 32 Epyc 9174 server cores using YAFU's implementation of the self initializing quadratic sieve.

As of January 2026, the number was reported to have been factored in 4 minutes and 57 seconds on an NVIDIA RTX 5070 Ti, the first such factorization on a complete quadratic sieve factorization pipeline on GPU.

=== RSA-110 ===
RSA-110 has 110 decimal digits (364 bits), and was factored in April 1992 by Arjen K. Lenstra and Mark S. Manasse in approximately one month.

The number can be factorized in less than four hours on overclocked to 3.5 GHz Intel Core2 Quad q9300, using GGNFS and Msieve binaries running by distributed version of the factmsieve Perl script.

The value and factorization are as follows:

RSA-110 = 35794234179725868774991807832568455403003778024228226193532908190484670252364677411513516111204504060317568667

RSA-110 = 6122421090493547576937037317561418841225758554253106999
        × 5846418214406154678836553182979162384198610505601062333

=== RSA-120 ===
RSA-120 has 120 decimal digits (397 bits), and was factored in June 1993 by Thomas Denny, Bruce Dodson, Arjen K. Lenstra, and Mark S. Manasse. The computation took under three months of actual computer time.

The value and factorization are as follows:

RSA-120 = 227010481295437363334259960947493668895875336466084780038173258247009162675779735389791151574049166747880487470296548479

RSA-120 = 327414555693498015751146303749141488063642403240171463406883
        × 693342667110830181197325401899700641361965863127336680673013

=== RSA-129 ===
RSA-129, having 129 decimal digits (426 bits), was not part of the 1991 RSA Factoring Challenge, but rather related to Martin Gardner's Mathematical Games column in the August 1977 issue of Scientific American.

RSA-129 was factored in April 1994 by a team led by Derek Atkins, Michael Graff, Arjen K. Lenstra and Paul Leyland, using approximately 1600 computers from around 600 volunteers connected over the Internet. A US$100 token prize was awarded by RSA Security for the factorization, which was donated to the Free Software Foundation.

The value and factorization are as follows:

RSA-129 = 114381625757888867669235779976146612010218296721242362562561842935706935245733897830597123563958705058989075147599290026879543541

RSA-129 = 3490529510847650949147849619903898133417764638493387843990820577
        × 32769132993266709549961988190834461413177642967992942539798288533

The factorization was found using the multiple polynomial quadratic sieve algorithm.

The factoring challenge included a message encrypted with RSA-129. When decrypted using the factorization the message was revealed to be "The Magic Words are Squeamish Ossifrage".

In 2015, RSA-129 was factored in about one day, with the CADO-NFS open source implementation of number field sieve, using a commercial cloud computing service for about $30.

=== RSA-130 ===
RSA-130 has 130 decimal digits (430 bits), and was factored on April 10, 1996, by a team led by Arjen K. Lenstra and composed of Jim Cowie, Marije Elkenbracht-Huizing, Wojtek Furmanski, Peter L. Montgomery, Damian Weber and Joerg Zayer.

The factorization was found in the third trial.

The value and factorization are as follows:

RSA-130 = 1807082088687404805951656164405905566278102516769401349170127021450056662540244048387341127590812303371781887966563182013214880557

RSA-130 = 39685999459597454290161126162883786067576449112810064832555157243
        × 45534498646735972188403686897274408864356301263205069600999044599

The factorization was found using the Number Field Sieve algorithm and the polynomial

   5748302248738405200 x5 +  9882261917482286102 x4
- 13392499389128176685 x3 + 16875252458877684989 x2
+  3759900174855208738 x1 - 46769930553931905995

which has a root of 12574411168418005980468 modulo RSA-130.

=== RSA-140 ===
RSA-140 has 140 decimal digits (463 bits), and was factored on February 2, 1999, by a team led by Herman te Riele and composed of Stefania Cavallar, Bruce Dodson, Arjen K. Lenstra, Paul Leyland, Walter Lioen, Peter L. Montgomery, Brian Murphy and Paul Zimmermann.

The value and factorization are as follows:

RSA-140 = 21290246318258757547497882016271517497806703963277216278233383215381949984056495911366573853021918316783107387995317230889569230873441936471

RSA-140 = 3398717423028438554530123627613875835633986495969597423490929302771479
        × 6264200187401285096151654948264442219302037178623509019111660653946049

The factorization was found using the Number Field Sieve algorithm and an estimated 2000 MIPS-years of computing time.

The matrix had 4671181 rows and 4704451 columns and weight 151141999 (32.36 nonzeros per row)

=== RSA-150 ===
RSA-150 has 150 decimal digits (496 bits), and was withdrawn from the challenge by RSA Security. RSA-150 was eventually factored into two 75-digit primes by Aoki et al. in 2004 using the general number field sieve (GNFS), years after bigger RSA numbers that were still part of the challenge had been solved.

The value and factorization are as follows:

RSA-150 = 155089812478348440509606754370011861770654545830995430655466945774312632703463465954363335027577729025391453996787414027003501631772186840890795964683

RSA-150 = 348009867102283695483970451047593424831012817350385456889559637548278410717
        × 445647744903640741533241125787086176005442536297766153493419724532460296199

=== RSA-155 ===
RSA-155 has 155 decimal digits (512 bits), and was factored on August 22, 1999, in a span of six months, by a team led by Herman te Riele and composed of Stefania Cavallar, Bruce Dodson, Arjen K. Lenstra, Walter Lioen, Peter L. Montgomery, Brian Murphy, Karen Aardal, Jeff Gilchrist, Gerard Guillerm, Paul Leyland, Joel Marchand, François Morain, Alec Muffett, Craig Putnam, Chris Putnam and Paul Zimmermann.

The value and factorization (in two prime factors of 78 decimal digits each) are as follows:

RSA-155 = 10941738641570527421809707322040357612003732945449205990913842131476349984288934784717997257891267332497625752899781833797076537244027146743531593354333897

RSA-155 = 102639592829741105772054196573991675900716567808038066803341933521790711307779
        × 106603488380168454820927220360012878679207958575989291522270608237193062808643

The factorization was found using the general number field sieve algorithm and an estimated 8000 MIPS-years of computing time.

The polynomials were 119377138320x^{5} − 80168937284997582yx^{4} − 66269852234118574445y^{2}x^{3} + 11816848430079521880356852y^{3}x^{2} + 7459661580071786443919743056y^{4}x − 40679843542362159361913708405064y^{5} and x − 39123079721168000771313449081y (this pair has a yield of relations approximately 13.5 times that of a random polynomial selection); 124722179 relations were collected in the sieving stage; the matrix had 6699191 rows and 6711336 columns and weight 417132631 (62.27 nonzeros per row).

=== RSA-160 ===
RSA-160 has 160 decimal digits (530 bits), and was factored on April 1, 2003, by a team from the University of Bonn and the German Federal Office for Information Security (BSI). The team contained J. Franke, F. Bahr, T. Kleinjung, M. Lochter, and M. Böhm.

The value and factorization (in two prime factors of 80 decimal digits each) are as follows:

RSA-160 = 2152741102718889701896015201312825429257773588845675980170497676778133145218859135673011059773491059602497907111585214302079314665202840140619946994927570407753

RSA-160 = 45427892858481394071686190649738831656137145778469793250959984709250004157335359
        × 47388090603832016196633832303788951973268922921040957944741354648812028493909367

The factorization was found using the general number field sieve algorithm.

=== RSA-170 ===
RSA-170 has 170 decimal digits (563 bits) and was first factored on December 29, 2009, by D. Bonenberger and M. Krone from Fachhochschule Braunschweig/Wolfenbüttel. An independent factorization was completed by S. A. Danilov and I. A. Popovyan two days later.

The value and factorization are as follows:

RSA-170 = 26062623684139844921529879266674432197085925380486406416164785191859999628542069361450283931914514618683512198164805919882053057222974116478065095809832377336510711545759

RSA-170 = 3586420730428501486799804587268520423291459681059978161140231860633948450858
          040593963
        × 7267029064107019078863797763923946264136137803856996670313708936002281582249
          587494493

The factorization was found using the general number field sieve algorithm.

=== RSA-576 ===
RSA-576 has 174 decimal digits (576 bits), and was factored on December 3, 2003, by J. Franke and T. Kleinjung from the University of Bonn. A cash prize of $10,000 was offered by RSA Security for a successful factorization.

The value and factorization are as follows:

RSA-576 = 188198812920607963838697239461650439807163563379417382700763356422988859715234665485319060606504743045317388011303396716199692321205734031879550656996221305168759307650257059

RSA-576 = 3980750864240649373971255005503864911990643623425267084063851895759463889572
          61768583317
        × 4727721461074353025362230719730482246329146953020971164598521711305207112563
          63590397527

The factorization was found using the general number field sieve algorithm.

=== RSA-180 ===
RSA-180 has 180 decimal digits (596 bits), and was factored on May 8, 2010, by S. A. Danilov and I. A. Popovyan from Moscow State University, Russia.

RSA-180 = 1911479277189866096892294666314546498129862462766673548641885036388072607034
          3679905877620136513516127813425829612810920004670291298456875280033022177775
          2773957404540495707851421041

RSA-180 = 4007800823297508779525813391041005725268293178158071765648821789984975727719
          50624613470377
        × 4769396887386118369955354773570708579399020760277882320319897758246062255957
          73435668861833

The factorization was found using the general number field sieve algorithm implementation running on three Intel Core i7 PCs.

=== RSA-190 ===
RSA-190 has 190 decimal digits (629 bits), and was factored on November 8, 2010, by I. A. Popovyan from Moscow State University, Russia, and A. Timofeev from CWI, Netherlands.

RSA-190 = 1907556405060696491061450432646028861081179759533184460647975622318915025587
          1841757540549761551215932934922604641526300932385092466032074171247261215808
          58185985938946945490481721756401423481

RSA-190 = 3171195257690152709485171289740475929805147316029450327784761927832793642798
          1256542415724309619
        × 6015260020444561641587641685526676183243543359471811072599763828083615704046
          0481625355619404899

=== RSA-640 ===
RSA-640 has 193 decimal digits (640 bits). A cash prize of US$20,000 was offered by RSA Security for a successful factorization. On November 2, 2005, F. Bahr, M. Boehm, J. Franke and T. Kleinjung of the German Federal Office for Information Security announced that they had factorized the number using GNFS as follows:

RSA-640 = 3107418240490043721350750035888567930037346022842727545720161948823206440518
          0815045563468296717232867824379162728380334154710731085019195485290073377248
          22783525742386454014691736602477652346609

RSA-640 = 1634733645809253848443133883865090859841783670033092312181110852389333100104
          508151212118167511579
        × 1900871281664822113126851573935413975471896789968515493666638539088027103802
          104498957191261465571

The computation took five months on eighty 2.2 GHz AMD Opteron CPUs.

The slightly larger RSA-200 was factored in May 2005 by the same team.

=== RSA-200 ===
RSA-200 has 200 decimal digits (663 bits), and factors into the two 100-digit primes given below.

On May 9, 2005, F. Bahr, M. Boehm, J. Franke, and T. Kleinjung announced that they had factorized the number using GNFS as follows:

RSA-200 = 2799783391122132787082946763872260162107044678695542853756000992932612840010
          7609345671052955360856061822351910951365788637105954482006576775098580557613
          579098734950144178863178946295187237869221823983

RSA-200 = 3532461934402770121272604978198464368671197400197625023649303468776121253679
          423200058547956528088349
        × 7925869954478333033347085841480059687737975857364219960734330341455767872818
          152135381409304740185467

The CPU time spent on finding these factors by a collection of parallel computers amounted – very approximately – to the equivalent of 75 years work for a single 2.2 GHz Opteron-based computer. Note that while this approximation serves to suggest the scale of the effort, it leaves out many complicating factors; the announcement states it more precisely.

=== RSA-210 ===
RSA-210 has 210 decimal digits (696 bits) and was factored in September 2013 by Ryan Propper:

RSA-210 = 2452466449002782119765176635730880184670267876783327597434144517150616008300
          3858721695220839933207154910362682719167986407977672324300560059203563124656
          1218465817904100131859299619933817012149335034875870551067

RSA-210 = 4359585683259407917999519653872144063854709102652201963187054821445240853452
          75999740244625255428455944579
        × 5625457617268841037562770073044474817438769440075105451049468510945483965774
          79473472146228550799322939273

=== RSA-704 ===
RSA-704 has 212 decimal digits (704 bits), and was factored by Shi Bai, Emmanuel Thomé and Paul Zimmermann. The factorization was announced July 2, 2012. A cash prize of US$30,000 was previously offered for a successful factorization.

RSA-704 = 7403756347956171282804679609742957314259318888923128908493623263897276503402
          8266276891996419625117843995894330502127585370118968098286733173273108930900
          552505116877063299072396380786710086096962537934650563796359

RSA-704 = 9091213529597818878440658302600437485892608310328358720428512168960411528640
          933367824950788367956756806141
        × 8143859259110045265727809126284429335877899002167627883200914172429324360133
          004116702003240828777970252499

=== RSA-220 ===
RSA-220 has 220 decimal digits (729 bits), and was factored by S. Bai, P. Gaudry, A. Kruppa, E. Thomé and P. Zimmermann. The factorization was announced on May 13, 2016.

RSA-220 = 2260138526203405784941654048610197513508038915719776718321197768109445641817
          9666766085931213065825772506315628866769704480700018111497118630021124879281
          99487482066070131066586646083327982803560379205391980139946496955261

RSA-220 = 6863656412267566274382371499288437800130842239979164844621244993321541061441
          4642667938213644208420192054999687
        × 3292907439486349812049301549212935291916455196536233952462686051169290349309
          4652463337824866390738191765712603

=== RSA-230 ===
RSA-230 has 230 decimal digits (762 bits), and was factored by Samuel S. Gross on August 15, 2018.

RSA-230 = 1796949159794106673291612844957324615636756180801260007088891883553172646034
          1490933493372247868650755230855864199929221814436684722874052065257937495694
          3483892631711525225256544109808191706117425097024407180103648316382885188526
          89

RSA-230 = 4528450358010492026612439739120166758911246047493700040073956759261590397250
          033699357694507193523000343088601688589
        × 3968132623150957588532394439049887341769533966621957829426966084093049516953
          598120833228447171744337427374763106901

=== RSA-232 ===
RSA-232 has 232 decimal digits (768 bits), and was factored on February 17, 2020, by N. L. Zamarashkin, D. A. Zheltkov and S. A. Matveev.

RSA-232 = 1009881397871923546909564894309468582818233821955573955141120516205831021338
          5285453743661097571543636649133800849170651699217015247332943892702802343809
          6090980497644054071120196541074755382494867277137407501157718230539834060616
          2079

RSA-232 = 2966909333208360660361779924242630634742946262521852394401857157419437019472
          3262390744910112571804274494074452751891
        × 3403816175197563438006609498491521420547121760734723172735163413276050706174
          8526506443144325148088881115083863017669

=== RSA-768 ===
RSA-768 has 232 decimal digits (768 bits), and was factored on December 12, 2009, over the span of two years, by Thorsten Kleinjung, Kazumaro Aoki, Jens Franke, Arjen K. Lenstra, Emmanuel Thomé, Pierrick Gaudry, Alexander Kruppa, Peter Montgomery, Joppe W. Bos, Dag Arne Osvik, Herman te Riele, Andrey Timofeev, and Paul Zimmermann.

RSA-768 = 1230186684530117755130494958384962720772853569595334792197322452151726400507
          2636575187452021997864693899564749427740638459251925573263034537315482685079
          1702612214291346167042921431160222124047927473779408066535141959745985690214
          3413

RSA-768 = 3347807169895689878604416984821269081770479498371376856891243138898288379387
          8002287614711652531743087737814467999489
        × 3674604366679959042824463379962795263227915816434308764267603228381573966651
          1279233373417143396810270092798736308917

The CPU time spent on finding these factors by a collection of parallel computers amounted approximately to the equivalent of almost 2000 years of computing on a single-core 2.2 GHz AMD Opteron-based computer.

=== RSA-240 ===
RSA-240 has 240 decimal digits (795 bits), and was factored in November 2019 by Fabrice Boudot, Pierrick Gaudry, Aurore Guillevic, Nadia Heninger, Emmanuel Thomé and Paul Zimmermann.

RSA-240 = 1246203667817187840658350446081065904348203746516788057548187888832896668011
          8821085503603957027250874750986476843845862105486553797025393057189121768431
          8286362846948405301614416430468066875699415246993185704183030512549594371372
          159029236099

RSA-240 = 5094359522858399145550510235808437141326483820241114731866602965218212064697
          46700620316443478873837606252372049619334517
        × 2446242088383181505678131390240028966538020925789314014520412213365584770951
          78155258218897735030590669041302045908071447

The CPU time spent on finding these factors amounted to approximately 900 core-years on a 2.1 GHz Intel Xeon Gold 6130 CPU. Compared to the factorization of RSA-768, the authors estimate that better algorithms sped their calculations by a factor of 3–4 and faster computers sped their calculation by a factor of 1.25–1.67.

=== RSA-250 ===
RSA-250 has 250 decimal digits (829 bits), and was factored in February 2020 by Fabrice Boudot, Pierrick Gaudry, Aurore Guillevic, Nadia Heninger, Emmanuel Thomé, and Paul Zimmermann. The announcement of the factorization occurred on February 28, 2020.

RSA-250 = 2140324650240744961264423072839333563008614715144755017797754920881418023447
          1401366433455190958046796109928518724709145876873962619215573630474547705208
          0511905649310668769159001975940569345745223058932597669747168173806936489469
          9871578494975937497937

RSA-250 = 6413528947707158027879019017057738908482501474294344720811685963202453234463
          0238623598752668347708737661925585694639798853367
        × 3337202759497815655622601060535511422794076034476755466678452098702384172921
          0037080257448673296881877565718986258036932062711

The factorisation of RSA-250 utilised approximately 2700 CPU core-years, using a 2.1 GHz Intel Xeon Gold 6130 CPU as a reference. The computation was performed with the Number Field Sieve algorithm, using the open source CADO-NFS software.

The team dedicated the computation to Peter Montgomery, an American mathematician known for his contributions to computational number theory and cryptography who died on February 18, 2020, and had contributed to factoring RSA-768.

=== RSA-260 ===
RSA-260 has 260 decimal digits (862 bits) and was factored by Eric Lu at Cognition on September 3, 2026.

RSA-260 = 2211282552952966643528108525502623092761208950247001539441374831912882294140
          2001986512729726569746599085900330031400051170742204560859276357953757185954
          2988389587092292384910067030341246205457845664136645406842143612930176940208
          46391065875914794251435144458199

RSA-260 = 4397328654844826923795068102505872571721883526553349659561256924505973939597
          593482272505698004801207988043088656411102133523080581
        × 5028695206842569864686141618253083416610081090075366674776775706538324961364
          412200138116378509733307971876652984898985905923678379

The factorisation of RSA-260 utilised approximately 4,900 GPU-days (about 13.5 GPU-years), an estimated $400,000 of compute at market prices, run on spare capacity in Cognition's GPU clusters. The computation was performed with the general number field sieve algorithm, using a significantly modified version of the open source CADO-NFS software whose GPU-accelerated lattice siever and block Wiedemann linear system solver were developed and operated with the assistance of Devin, an autonomous software engineering agent. Source code has been published by Cognition.

=== RSA-270 ===
RSA-270 has 270 decimal digits (895 bits) and was factored by Eric Lu at Cognition on November 12, 2026.

RSA-270 = 2331085303444075445276376569106805241456198124803054490429486119684959182451
          3578286788836931857711641821391926857265831491306067262691135402760979316634
          1626693946596196427744273886601876896313468704059066746903123910748277606548
          649151920812699309766587514735456594993207

RSA-270 = 3593533595608357710392029803946511867009273207326044398021336309907670753875
          16847337701049401067297464438120309866365659527898117552867
        x 6486888855840627142058758983602413594225652688984057187781996759637378157653
          12999868204516506259289963694375931123641015125668887749021

=== RSA-896 ===
RSA-896 has 270 decimal digits (896 bits), and was factored by Stephen A. Weis on September 19, 2026 with assistance of Claude. A cash prize of $75,000 was previously offered for a successful factorization.

RSA-896 = 4120234369866595438555313653325759481798116998443279828454556264338764455652
          4842619809887042316184187926142024718886949256093177637503342113098239748515
          0944909106910269861031862704114880866970564902903653658867433731720813104105
          190864254793282601391257624033946373269391

RSA-896 = 6366067297694404991665799502360367517499120143715095577135700275089718095345
          51913252252094954941974952859310861988904737359709200557919
        × 6472181611021954480587686981776239513806169362669869892430119335728628709058
          30904361851542450154852431416136790787107595965374752513489

The factorisation was found using a Claude-assisted port of CADO-NFS to run on GPUs. Orchestrating a fleet to run on scavenged idle capacity, the factorisation was found using a maximum of 2048 GPUs for about 30 GPU-years over 10 days.

== Unsolved RSA numbers ==
=== RSA-280 ===
RSA-280 has 280 decimal digits (928 bits), and has not been factored so far.

RSA-280 = 1790707753365795418841729699379193276395981524363782327873718589639655966058
          5783742549640396449103593468573113599487089842785784500698716853446786525536
          5503525160280656363736307175332772875499505341538927978510751699922197178159
          7724733184279534477239566789173532366357270583106789

=== RSA-290 ===
RSA-290 has 290 decimal digits (962 bits), and has not been factored so far.

RSA-290 = 3050235186294003157769199519894966400298217959748768348671526618673316087694
          3419156362946151249328917515864630224371171221716993844781534383325603218163
          2549201100649908073932858897185243836002511996505765970769029474322210394327
          60575157628357292075495937664206199565578681309135044121854119

=== RSA-300 ===
RSA-300 has 300 decimal digits (995 bits), and has not been factored so far.

RSA-300 = 2769315567803442139028689061647233092237608363983953254005036722809375824714
          9473946190060218756255124317186573105075074546238828817121274630072161346956
          4396741836389979086904304472476001839015983033451909174663464663867829125664
          459895575157178816900228792711267471958357574416714366499722090015674047

=== RSA-309 ===
RSA-309 has 309 decimal digits (1,024 bits), and has not been factored so far.

RSA-309 = 1332943998825757583801437794588036586217112243226684602854588261917276276670
          5425540467426933349195015527349334314071822840746357352800368666521274057591
          1870128339157499072351179666739658503429931021985160714113146720277365006623
          6927218079163559142755190653347914002967258537889160429597714204365647842739
          10949

=== RSA-1024 ===
RSA-1024 has 309 decimal digits (1,024 bits), and has not been factored so far. $100,000 was previously offered for factorization.

RSA-1024 = 135066410865995223349603216278805969938881475605667027524485143851526510604
           859533833940287150571909441798207282164471551373680419703964191743046496589
           274256239341020864383202110372958725762358509643110564073501508187510676594
           629205563685529475213500852879416377328533906109750544334999811150056977236
           890927563

=== RSA-310 ===
RSA-310 has 310 decimal digits (1,028 bits), and has not been factored so far.

RSA-310 = 1848210397825850670380148517702559371400899745254512521925707445580334710601
          4125276757082979328578439013881047668984294331264191394626965245834649837246
          5163148188847336415136873623631778358751846501708714541673402642461569061162
          0116380982484120857688483676576094865930188367141388795454378671343386258291
          687641

=== RSA-320 ===
RSA-320 has 320 decimal digits (1,061 bits), and has not been factored so far.

RSA-320 = 2136810696410071796012087414500377295863767938372793352315068620363196552357
          8837094085435000951700943373838321997220564166302488321590128061531285010636
          8571638978998117122840139210685346167726847173232244364004850978371121744321
          8270343654835754061017503137136489303437996367224915212044704472299799616089
          2591129924218437

=== RSA-330 ===
RSA-330 has 330 decimal digits (1,094 bits), and has not been factored so far.

RSA-330 = 1218708633106058693138173980143325249157710686226055220408666600017481383238
          1352456802425903555880722805261111079089882303717632638856140900933377863089
          0634828167900405006112727432172179976427017137792606951424995281839383708354
          6364684839261149319768449396541020909665209789862312609604983709923779304217
          01862444655244698696759267

=== RSA-340 ===
RSA-340 has 340 decimal digits (1,128 bits), and has not been factored so far.

RSA-340 = 2690987062294695111996484658008361875931308730357496490239672429933215694995
          2758588771223263308836649715112756731997946779608413232406934433532048898585
          9176676580752231563884394807622076177586625973975236127522811136600110415063
          0004691128152106812042872285697735145105026966830649540003659922618399694276
          990464815739966698956947129133275233

=== RSA-350 ===
RSA-350 has 350 decimal digits (1,161 bits), and has not been factored so far.

RSA-350 = 2650719995173539473449812097373681101529786464211583162467454548229344585504
          3495841191504413349124560193160478146528433707807716865391982823061751419151
          6068496555750496764686447379170711424873128631468168019548127029171231892127
          2886825928263239383444398948209649800021987837742009498347263667908976501360
          3382322972552204068806061829535529820731640151

=== RSA-360 ===
RSA-360 has 360 decimal digits (1,194 bits), and has not been factored so far.

RSA-360 = 2186820202343172631466406372285792654649158564828384065217121866374227745448
          7764963889680817334211643637752157994969516984539482486678141304751672197524
          0052350576247238785129338002757406892629970748212734663781952170745916609168
          9358372359962787832802257421757011302526265184263565623426823456522539874717
          61591019113926725623095606566457918240614767013806590649

=== RSA-370 ===
RSA-370 has 370 decimal digits (1,227 bits), and has not been factored so far.

RSA-370 = 1888287707234383972842703127997127272470910519387718062380985523004987076701
          7212819937261952549039800018961122586712624661442288502745681454363170484690
          7379449525034797494321694352146271320296579623726631094822493455672541491544
          2700993152879235272779266578292207161032746297546080025793864030543617862620
          878802244305286292772467355603044265985905970622730682658082529621

=== RSA-380 ===
RSA-380 has 380 decimal digits (1,261 bits), and has not been factored so far.

RSA-380 = 3013500443120211600356586024101276992492167997795839203528363236610578565791
          8270750937407901898070219843622821090980641477056850056514799336625349678549
          2187941807116344787358312651772858878058620717489800725333606564197363165358
          2237779263423501952646847579678711825720733732734169866406145425286581665755
          6977260763553328252421574633011335112031733393397168350585519524478541747311

=== RSA-390 ===
RSA-390 has 390 decimal digits (1,294 bits), and has not been factored so far.

RSA-390 = 2680401941182388454501037079346656065366941749082852678729822424397709178250
          4623002472848967604282562331676313645413672467684996118812899734451228212989
          1630084759485063423604911639099585186833094019957687550377834977803400653628
          6955344904367437281870253414058414063152368812498486005056223028285341898040
          0795447435865033046248751475297412398697088084321037176392288312785544402209
          1083492089

=== RSA-400 ===
RSA-400 has 400 decimal digits (1,327 bits), and has not been factored so far.

RSA-400 = 2014096878945207511726700485783442547915321782072704356103039129009966793396
          1419850865094551022604032086955587930913903404388675137661234189428453016032
          6191193056768564862615321256630010268346471747836597131398943140685464051631
          7519403149294308737302321684840956395183222117468443578509847947119995373645
          3607109795994713287610750434646825511120586422993705980787028106033008907158
          74500584758146849481

=== RSA-410 ===
RSA-410 has 410 decimal digits (1,360 bits), and has not been factored so far.

RSA-410 = 1965360147993876141423945274178745707926269294439880746827971120992517421770
          1079138139324539033381077755540830342989643633394137538983355218902490897764
          4412968474332754608531823550599154905901691559098706892516477785203855688127
          0635069372091564594333528156501293924133186705141485137856845741766150159437
          6063244163040088180887087028771717321932252992567756075264441680858665410918
          431223215368025334985424358839

=== RSA-420 ===
RSA-420 has 420 decimal digits (1,393 bits), and has not been factored so far.

RSA-420 = 2091366302476510731652556423163330737009653626605245054798522959941292730258
          1898373570076188752609749648953525484925466394800509169219344906273145413634
          2427186266197097846022969248579454916155633686388106962365337549155747268356
          4666583846809964354191550136023170105917441056517493690125545320242581503730
          3405952887826925813912683942756431114820292313193705352716165790132673270514
          3817744164107601735413785886836578207979

=== RSA-430 ===
RSA-430 has 430 decimal digits (1,427 bits), and has not been factored so far.

RSA-430 = 3534635645620271361541209209607897224734887106182307093292005188843884213420
          6950355315163258889704268733101305820000124678051064321160104990089741386777
          2424190744453885127173046498565488221441242210687945185565975582458031351338
          2070785777831859308900851761495284515874808406228585310317964648830289141496
          3289966226854692560410075067278840383808716608668377947047236323168904650235
          70092246473915442026549955865931709542468648109541

=== RSA-440 ===
RSA-440 has 440 decimal digits (1,460 bits), and has not been factored so far.

RSA-440 = 2601428211955602590070788487371320550539810804595235289423508589663391270837
          4310252674800592426746319007978890065337573160541942868114065643853327229484
          5029942332226171123926606357523257736893667452341192247905168387893684524818
          0307729497304959710847337973805145673263119916483529703607405432752966630781
          2234597766390750441445314408171802070904072739275930410299359006059619305590
          701939627725296116299946059898442103959412221518213407370491

=== RSA-450 ===
RSA-450 has 450 decimal digits (1,493 bits), and has not been factored so far.

RSA-450 = 1984634237142836623497230721861131427789462869258862089878538009871598692569
          0078791591684242367262529704652673686711493985446003494265587358393155378115
          8032447061155145160770580926824366573211993981662614635734812647448360573856
          3132247491715526997278115514905618953253443957435881503593414842367096046182
          7643434794849824315251510662855699269624207451365738384255497823390996283918
          3287667419172988072221996532403300258906083211160744508191024837057033

=== RSA-460 ===
RSA-460 has 460 decimal digits (1,526 bits), and has not been factored so far.

RSA-460 = 1786856020404004433262103789212844585886400086993882955081051578507634807524
          1464078819812169681394445771476334608488687746254318292828603396149562623036
          3564554675355258128655971003201417831521222464468666642766044146641933788836
          8932452217321354860484353296131403821175862890998598653858373835628654351880
          4806362231643082386848731052350115776715521149453708868428108303016983133390
          0416365515466857004900847501644808076825638918266848964153626486460448430073
          4909

=== RSA-1536 ===
RSA-1536 has 463 decimal digits (1,536 bits), and has not been factored so far. $150,000 was previously offered for successful factorization.

RSA-1536 = 184769970321174147430683562020016440301854933866341017147178577491065169671
           116124985933768430543574458561606154457179405222971773252466096064694607124
           962372044202226975675668737842756238950876467844093328515749657884341508847
           552829818672645133986336493190808467199043187438128336350279547028265329780
           293491615581188104984490831954500984839377522725705257859194499387007369575
           568843693381277961308923039256969525326162082367649031603655137144791393234
           7169566988069

=== RSA-470 ===
RSA-470 has 470 decimal digits (1,559 bits), and has not been factored so far.

RSA-470 = 1705147378468118520908159923888702802518325585214915968358891836980967539803
          6897711442383602526314519192366612270595815510311970886116763177669964411814
          0957486602388713064698304619191359016382379244440741228665455229545368837485
          5874455212895044521809620818878887632439504936237680657994105330538621759598
          4047709603954312447692725276887594590658792939924609261264788572032212334726
          8553025718835659126454325220771380103576695555550710440908570895393205649635
          76770285413369

=== RSA-480 ===
RSA-480 has 480 decimal digits (1,593 bits), and has not been factored so far.

RSA-480 = 3026570752950908697397302503155918035891122835769398583955296326343059761445
          7144169659817040125185215913853345598217234371231338324773210726853524776378
          4105186549246199888070331088462855743520880671299302895546822695492968577380
          7067958428022008294111984222973260208233693152589211629901686973933487362360
          8129660418514569063995282978176790149760521395548532814196534676974259747930
          6858645849268328985687423881853632604706175564461719396117318298679820785491
          875674946700413680932103

=== RSA-490 ===
RSA-490 has 490 decimal digits (1,626 bits), and has not been factored so far.

RSA-490 = 1860239127076846517198369354026076875269515930592839150201028353837031025971
          3738522164743327949206433999068225531855072554606782138800841162866037393324
          6578171804201717222449954030315293547871401362961501065002486552688663415745
          9758925793594165651020789220067311416926076949777767604906107061937873540601
          5942747316176193775374190713071154900658503269465516496828568654377183190586
          9537640698044932638893492457914750855858980849190488385315076922453755527481
          1376719096144119390052199027715691

=== RSA-500 ===
RSA-500 has 500 decimal digits (1,659 bits) and has not been factored so far.

RSA-500 = 1897194133748626656330534743317202527237183591953428303184581123062450458870
          7687605943212347625766427494554764419515427586743205659317254669946604982419
          7301601038125215285400688031516401611623963128370629793265939405081077581694
          4786041721411024641038040278701109808664214800025560454687625137745393418221
          5494821277335671735153472656328448001134940926442438440198910908603252678814
          7850601132077287172819942445113232019492229554237898606631074891074722425617
          39680319169243814676235712934292299974411361

=== RSA-617 ===
RSA-617 has 617 decimal digits (2,048 bits) and has not been factored so far.

RSA-617 = 2270180129378501419358040512020458674106123596276658390709402187921517148311
          9139894870133091111044901683400949483846818299518041763507948922590774925466
          0881718792594659210265970467004498198990968620394600177430944738110569912941
          2854289188085536270740767072259373777266697344097736124333639730805176309150
          6836310795312607239520365290032105848839507981452307299417185715796297454995
          0235053160409198591937180233074148804462179228008317660409386563445710347785
          5345712108053073639453592393265186603051504106096643731332367283153932350006
          7937107541955437362433248361242525945868802353916766181532375855504886901432
          221349733

=== RSA-2048 ===
RSA-2048 has 617 decimal digits (2,048 bits). It is the largest of the RSA numbers and carried the largest cash prize for its factorization, $200,000.

RSA-2048 = 2519590847565789349402718324004839857142928212620403202777713783604366202070
           7595556264018525880784406918290641249515082189298559149176184502808489120072
           8449926873928072877767359714183472702618963750149718246911650776133798590957
           0009733045974880842840179742910064245869181719511874612151517265463228221686
           9987549182422433637259085141865462043576798423387184774447920739934236584823
           8242811981638150106748104516603773060562016196762561338441436038339044149526
           3443219011465754445417842402092461651572335077870774981712577246796292638635
           6373289912154831438167899885040445364023527381951378636564391212010397122822
           120720357

== See also ==
- Integer factorization records
- RSA Factoring Challenge (includes table with size and status of all numbers)
- RSA Secret-Key Challenge
