= Çetin Kaya Koç =

Turkish cryptographic engineer

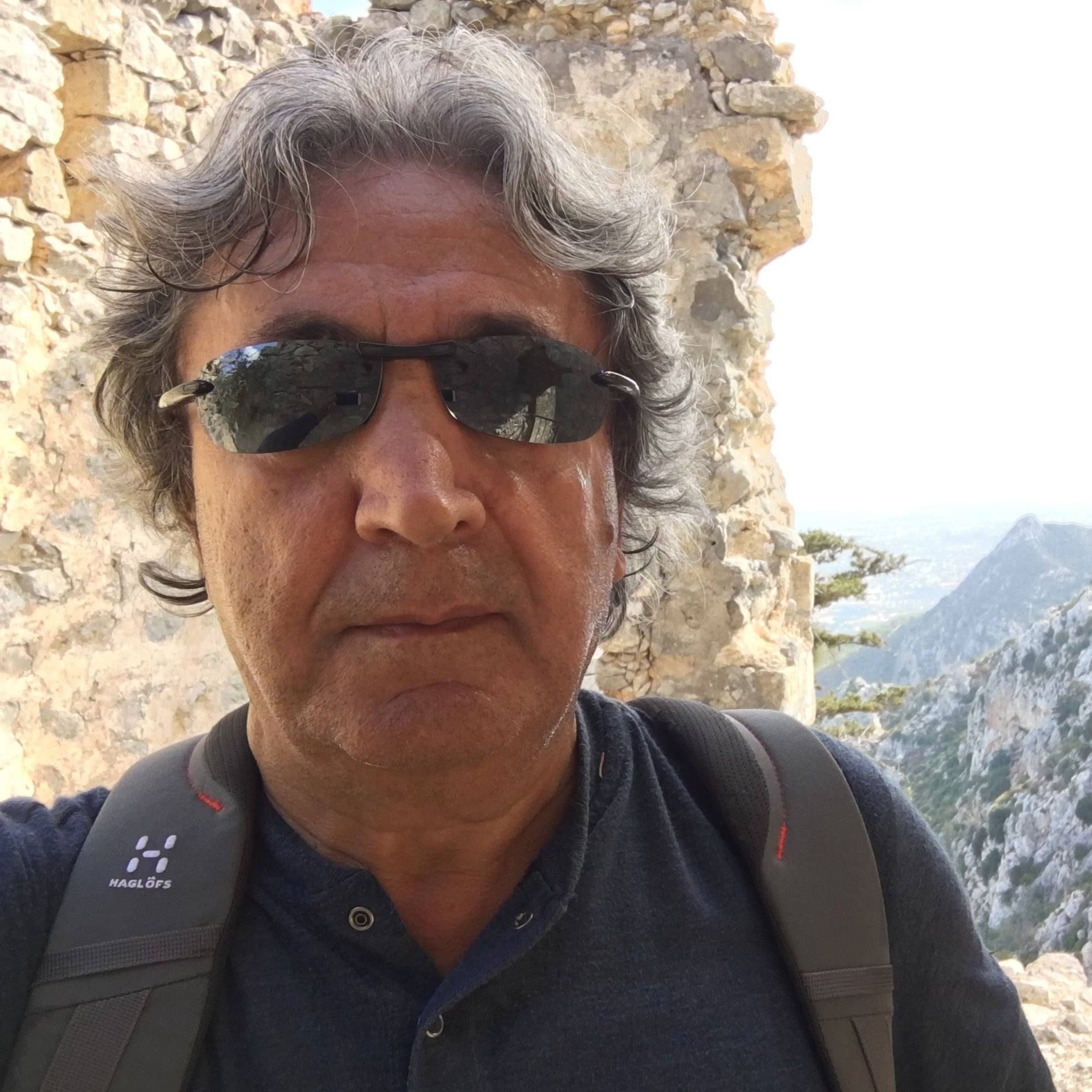
- Born: 23 January 1957 (age 69); Ağrı, Turkey
- Occupations: Cryptographic engineer, author and academic

Academic background
- Education: B.S. Electrical Engineering; Ph.D. Electrical and Computer Engineering
- Alma mater: İstanbul Technical University; University of California Santa Barbara
- Thesis: Parallel Algorithms for Interpolation and Approximation (1988)

Academic work
- Institutions: University of California Santa Barbara; University of Houston; Oregon State University
- Website: cetinkayakoc.net koclab.net

Çetin Kaya Koç (born 23 January 1957, Ağrı, Turkey) is a Turkish-American cryptographic engineer, academic, and author known for his research and work in cryptographic engineering, secure hardware design, finite field arithmetic, and side‑channel security.

He has retired from Computer Science Department at the University of California, Santa Barbara and has held permanent academic appointments in the United States, and visiting appointments in Turkey, Italy, and China.

Koç is the co‑founder of the Conference on Cryptographic Hardware and Embedded Systems (CHES) and the founding Editor‑in‑Chief of the Journal of Cryptographic Engineering.

== Biography & Education ==
Koç was born in Ağrı, Turkey, where he completed his early education before earning a B.S. degree (summa cum laude) in Electrical Engineering from İstanbul Technical University. He then received his Ph.D. in Electrical and Computer Engineering from the University of California, Santa Barbara in 1988, focusing on computer architecture, parallel algorithms and hardware implementations for algebraic computation.

== Career ==
Following his doctoral studies, Koç began his academic career as an assistant professor at the University of Houston from 1988 to 1992. He then joined Oregon State University, where he progressed from assistant to full professor (1992–2007) and established the Information Security Laboratory, serving as a central hub for research on secure hardware and embedded cryptography.

Koç has held faculty positions at the University of California, Santa Barbara and maintained international appointments, including visiting roles at Nanjing University of Aeronautics and Astronautics and at several universities in Turkey, supervising doctoral and master's candidates and directing collaborative research programs.

In 1999, Koç co‑founded the Conference on Cryptographic Hardware and Embedded Systems (CHES) with Christof Paar. CHES has become one of the premier international fora for research on cryptographic hardware, embedded security, and side‑channel analysis.

Koç has been a foundational figure in cryptographic engineering. He co-founded the Workshop on Cryptographic Hardware and Embedded Systems (CHES) in 1999 and served as program co-chair for five consecutive years (1999–2003) andcontinuously served in the steering committee, establishing CHES as a leading conference in software and hardware realization of cryptography.

He also founded and served as Editor-in-Chief of the Journal of Cryptographic Engineering, overseeing its inaugural publication and shaping it into a premier venue for research on cryptographic hardware and embedded systems. Koç contributed to practical cryptographic software development, notably as one of the designers of the RSAREF software toolkit, a widely used reference implementation of RSA cryptography.

== Research and works ==
His work has been recognized with prestigious awards, including the ACM CCS Test of Time Award and the USENIX 2024 Distinguished Paper Award. An accomplished author, he has published books such as Cryptographic Engineering (2009), Cryptographic Algorithms on Reconfigurable Hardware, Partially Homomorphic Encryption, and several monographs on finite field arithmetic and post-quantum cryptography.

Koç is the first researcher who coined or invented the term "Cryptographic Engineering" and started using it actively: as the name of a course offered at EPFL, Switzerland every year since 2002, the name of a book, and the name of the journal he had founded. Koç described the detailed definition and history of cryptographic engineering in an article published in 2011, entitled "Introduction to Cryptographic Engineering".

Koç’s research contributions span multiple foundational areas in cryptographic engineering and secure computation. His work in cryptographic engineering focuses on the design and optimization of secure hardware and software implementations of cryptographic systems, including practical realizations of public‑key and symmetric algorithms, secure embedded systems, and high‑performance cryptographic components for real‑world applications.

He has played a leading role in developing architectures and algorithms for finite field and ring arithmetic, which underpin efficient modular multiplication and exponentiation used in public‑key protocols, elliptic‑curve cryptography, and error‑correcting codes.

His work addresses challenges in random number generation, privacy‑preserving computation, and the application of homomorphic encryption to machine learning.

In more recent work, he has contributed to post‑quantum cryptography and homomorphic encryption, co‑authoring monographs on partially homomorphic schemes and exploring secure computation models that allow operations on encrypted data without decryption.

== Awards and honours ==
Koç has been recognized by both academic institutions and professional societies for his contributions to cryptographic engineering and secure system design.

- 2001 – Award for Outstanding and Sustained Research Leadership, Oregon State University.
- 2007 – Elected Fellow of the Institute of Electrical and Electronics Engineers (IEEE) for contributions to cryptographic engineering.
- 2020 – International Fellowship for Outstanding Researchers, Scientific and Technological Research Council of Türkiye (TÜBİTAK).
- 2023 – Life Fellow of the IEEE for sustained contributions to cryptographic engineering.

== Selected publications ==
=== Books ===
- Rodriguez-Henriquez, Francisco; Saqib, N. A.; Pérez, Arturo Díaz; Koc, Cetin Kaya (2007-04-03). Cryptographic Algorithms on Reconfigurable Hardware. Springer Science & Business Media. ISBN 978-0-387-36682-1.
- Koc, Cetin Kaya (2008-12-11). Cryptographic Engineering. Springer Science & Business Media. ISBN 978-0-387-71817-0.
- Koç, Çetin Kaya (2015). Open Problems in Mathematics and Computational Science. Cham: Springer International Publishing AG. ISBN 978-3-319-10682-3.
- Koç, Çetin Kaya, ed. (2018). Cyber-Physical Systems Security (1st ed. 2018 ed.). Cham: Springer International Publishing : Imprint: Springer. ISBN 978-3-319-98935-8.
- Koc, Cetin Kaya. "Partially Homomorphic Encryption | springerprofessional.de". www.springerprofessional.de.

=== Conference proceedings ===
- Koç, Çetin K.; Paar, Christof, eds. (1999). Cryptographic Hardware and Embedded Systems: First InternationalWorkshop, CHES'99 Worcester, MA, USA, August 12–13, 1999 Proceedings. Lecture Notes in Computer Science. Vol. 1717. Berlin, Heidelberg: Springer Berlin Heidelberg. doi:10.1007/3-540-48059-5. ISBN 978-3-540-66646-2.
- Koç, Çetin K.; Paar, Christof, eds. (2000). Cryptographic Hardware and Embedded Systems — CHES 2000. Lecture Notes in Computer Science. Vol. 1965. doi:10.1007/3-540-44499-8. ISBN 978-3-540-41455-1. ISSN 0302-9743.
- Koç, Çetin K.; Naccache, David; Paar, Christof, eds. (2001). Cryptographic Hardware and Embedded Systems — CHES 2001. Lecture Notes in Computer Science. Vol. 2162. doi:10.1007/3-540-44709-1. ISBN 978-3-540-42521-2. ISSN 0302-9743.
- Kaliski, Burton S.; Koç, çetin K.; Paar, Christof, eds. (2003). Cryptographic Hardware and Embedded Systems - CHES 2002. Lecture Notes in Computer Science. Vol. 2523. doi:10.1007/3-540-36400-5. ISBN 978-3-540-00409-7. ISSN 0302-9743.
- Walter, Colin D.; Koç, Çetin K.; Paar, Christof, eds. (2003). Cryptographic Hardware and Embedded Systems - CHES 2003. Lecture Notes in Computer Science. Vol. 2779. doi:10.1007/978-3-540-45238-6. ISBN 978-3-540-40833-8. ISSN 0302-9743.
- von zur Gathen, Joachim; Imaña, José Luis; Koç, Çetin Kaya, eds. (2008). Arithmetic of Finite Fields. Lecture Notes in Computer Science. Vol. 5130. doi:10.1007/978-3-540-69499-1. ISBN 978-3-540-69498-4. ISSN 0302-9743.
- Koç, Çetin Kaya; Mesnager, Sihem; Savaş, Erkay, eds. (2015). Arithmetic of Finite Fields. Lecture Notes in Computer Science. Vol. 9061. doi:10.1007/978-3-319-16277-5. ISBN 978-3-319-16276-8. ISSN 0302-9743.
