= Integer factorization records =

Accomplishments in factoring large integers

Integer factorization is the process of determining which prime numbers divide a given positive integer. Doing this quickly has applications in cryptography. The difficulty depends on both the size and form of the number and its prime factors; it is currently very difficult to factorize large semiprimes (and, indeed, most numbers that have no small factors).

== Numbers of a general form ==
The first enormous distributed factorisation was RSA-129, a 129-digit challenge number described in the Scientific American article of 1977 which first popularised the RSA cryptosystem. It was factorised between September 1993 and April 1994, using MPQS, with relations contributed by about 600 people through the internet, and the final stages of the calculation performed on a MasPar supercomputer at Bell Labs.

Between January and August 1999, RSA-155, a 155-digit challenge number prepared by the RSA company, was factorised using GNFS with relations again contributed by a large group, and the final stages of the calculation performed in just over nine days on the Cray C916 supercomputer at the SARA Amsterdam Academic Computer Center.

In January 2002, it was announced the factorisation of a 158-digit cofactor of 2^{953} + 1, using a couple of months on about 25 PCs at the University of Bonn, with the final stages done using a cluster of six Pentium-III PCs.

In April 2003, the same team factored the 160-digit RSA-160 using about a hundred CPUs at BSI, with the final stages of the calculation done using 25 processors of an SGI Origin supercomputer.

The 576-bit (174-digit) RSA-576 was factored by members of the NFSNET collaboration in December 2003, using resources at BSI and the University of Bonn; soon afterwards it was announced a group factored a 164-digit cofactor of 2^{1826} + 1.

A 176-digit cofactor of 11^{281} + 1 was factored between February and May 2005 using machines at NTT and Rikkyo University in Japan.

The 663-bit (200-digit) RSA-200 challenge number was factored between December 2003 and May 2005, using a cluster of 80 Opteron processors at BSI in Germany; the announcement was made on 9 May 2005. They later factored the slightly smaller RSA-640 challenge number in November 2005.

On December 12, 2009, a team including researchers from the CWI, the EPFL, INRIA and NTT in addition to the authors of the previous record factored RSA-768, a 232-digit semiprime. They used the equivalent of almost 2000 years of computing on a single core 2.2 GHz AMD Opteron.

In November 2019, the 795-bit (240-digit) RSA-240 was factored.

In February 2020, the factorization of the 829-bit (250-digit) RSA-250 was completed.

On September 3, 2026, the factorization of the 862-bit (260-digit) RSA-260 was completed by Eric Lu at Cognition. The computation used a GPU-accelerated implementation of the general number field sieve based on CADO-NFS, developed and operated with the Devin software engineering agent, totalling about 4,900 GPU-days.

On September 19, 2026, the factorization of the 896-bit (270-digit) RSA-896 was completed by Stephen A. Weis with assistance of Claude.

== Numbers of a special form ==
12^{151} − 1, of 542 bits (163 digits), was factored between April and July 1993 by a team at CWI and Oregon State University.

2^{773} + 1, of 774 bits (233 digits), was factored between April and November 2000 by 'The Cabal', with the matrix step done over 250 hours on the Cray also used for RSA-155.

2^{809} − 1, of 809 bits (244 digits), had its factorisation announced at the start of January 2003. Sieving was done at the CWI, at the Scientific Computing Institute and the Pure Mathematics Department at Bonn University, and using private resources. The linear algebra step was done at SARA in Amsterdam.

6^{353} − 1, of 911 bits (275 digits), was factored between September 2005 and January 2006 using SNFS.

2^{1039} − 1, of 1039 bits (313 digits) (though a factor of 23 bits was already known) was factored between September 2006 and May 2007 by a group at NTT, EPFL and the University of Bonn.

2^{1061} − 1, of 1061 bits (320 digits) was factored between early 2011 and 4 August 2012 by a group at CSU Fullerton, using the nfs@home BOINC project for about 300 CPU-years of sieving; the linear algebra was run at the Trestles cluster at SDSC and the Lonestar cluster at TACC and needed an additional 35 CPU-years.

All unfactored parts of the numbers 2^{n} − 1 with n between 1000 and 1200 were factored by a multiple-number-sieve approach in which much of the sieving step could be done simultaneously for multiple numbers, starting in 2010. To be precise, n = 1081 (326 digits) was completed on 11 March 2013; n = 1111 (335 digits) on 13 June 2013; n = 1129 (340 digits) on 20 September 2013; n = 1153 (348 digits) on 28 October 2013; n = 1159 (349 digits) on 9 February 2014; n = 1177 (355 digits) on 29 May 2014, n = 1193 (360 digits) on 22 August 2014, and n = 1199 (361 digits) on 11 December 2014; the first detailed announcement was made in late August 2014. The total effort for the project is of the order of 7500 CPU-years on 2.2 GHz Opterons, with roughly 5700 years spent sieving and 1800 years on linear algebra.

2^{1277} − 1, of 1277 bits (385 digits), was factored in September 2026, this number is the current record of special number field sieve.

== Largest penultimate prime factor ==
The record of the prime factor other than the ultimate prime factor has 159 decimal digits; it is a prime factor of 3^{709}+1.

== Comparison to efforts by individuals ==
As of the end of 2007, thanks to the constant decline in memory prices, the ready availability of multi-core 64-bit computers, and the availability of the efficient sieving code via ggnfs and of robust open-source software such as msieve for the finishing stages, special-form numbers of up to 750 bits (226 digits) and general-form numbers of up to about 520 bits (157 digits) can be factored in a few months on a few PCs by a single person without any special mathematical experience. These bounds increase to about 950 bits (286 digits) and 600 bits (181 digits) if it were possible to secure the collaboration of a few dozen PCs for sieving; currently the amount of memory and the CPU power of a single machine for the finishing stage are equal barriers to progress.

In 2009, a 512-bit (155-digit) RSA key was factored. This key had been used to sign the TI-83 graphing calculator using software found on the internet; this eventually led to the Texas Instruments signing key controversy.

In September 2013, the 696-bit (210-digit) RSA-210 was factored using institutional resources; between March 2013 and October 2014, another 210-digit number (the 117th term in the home prime sequence starting with 49), using $7600 worth of processing time on Amazon EC2 machines for the sieving, and four months on a dual Xeon E5-2687W v1 for the linear algebra.

== Records for efforts by quantum computers ==
The largest number reliably factored by Shor's algorithm, rather than some other quantum method, is 21 which was factored in 2012. The number 15 had previously been factored by several labs and subsequent attempts to factorise 35 failed.

Other methods have been used to factorise specific numbers on quantum computers. In April 2012, the factorization of 143 = 13 × 11 by a room-temperature (300 K) NMR adiabatic quantum computer was reported by a group. In November 2014 it was discovered that the factorisation of other numbers could lead to the same equations that were solved in the 2012 paper, thus the 2012 experiment could be considered to have also factored much larger numbers without knowing it. In April 2016 the 18-bit number 200,099 was factored using quantum annealing on a D-Wave 2X quantum processor. Shortly after, the number 291,311 was factored using NMR at higher than room temperature. In late 2019, Zapata computing claimed to have factored 1,099,551,473,989, and in 2021 released a paper describing this computation. In 2024, a new approach to embed prime factoring problems into quantum annealers has been proposed, leading to (i) the embedding of 21×12 prime factoring problems into a D-Wave Pegasus architecture; (ii) the factoring of 8,219,999 by using a quantum annealer without exploiting hybrid techniques.

As such, claims of factoring with quantum computers have however been criticized for depending heavily on classical computation to reduce the number of qubits required. For example, the factorization of 1,099,551,473,989 relied on classical pre-processing to reduce the problem to a three-qubit quantum circuit. Furthermore, the three numbers factored in this paper (200,099, 291,311, and 1,099,551,473,989) can easily be factored using Fermat's factorization method, requiring only 3, 1, and 1 iterations of the loop respectively. In 2025, existing factorisation records using a quantum computer were replicated using a VIC-20, highlighting the ease of factoring numbers with particular structures.

== See also ==
- Largest known prime number
