= Arjen Lenstra =

Dutch mathematician (born 1956)

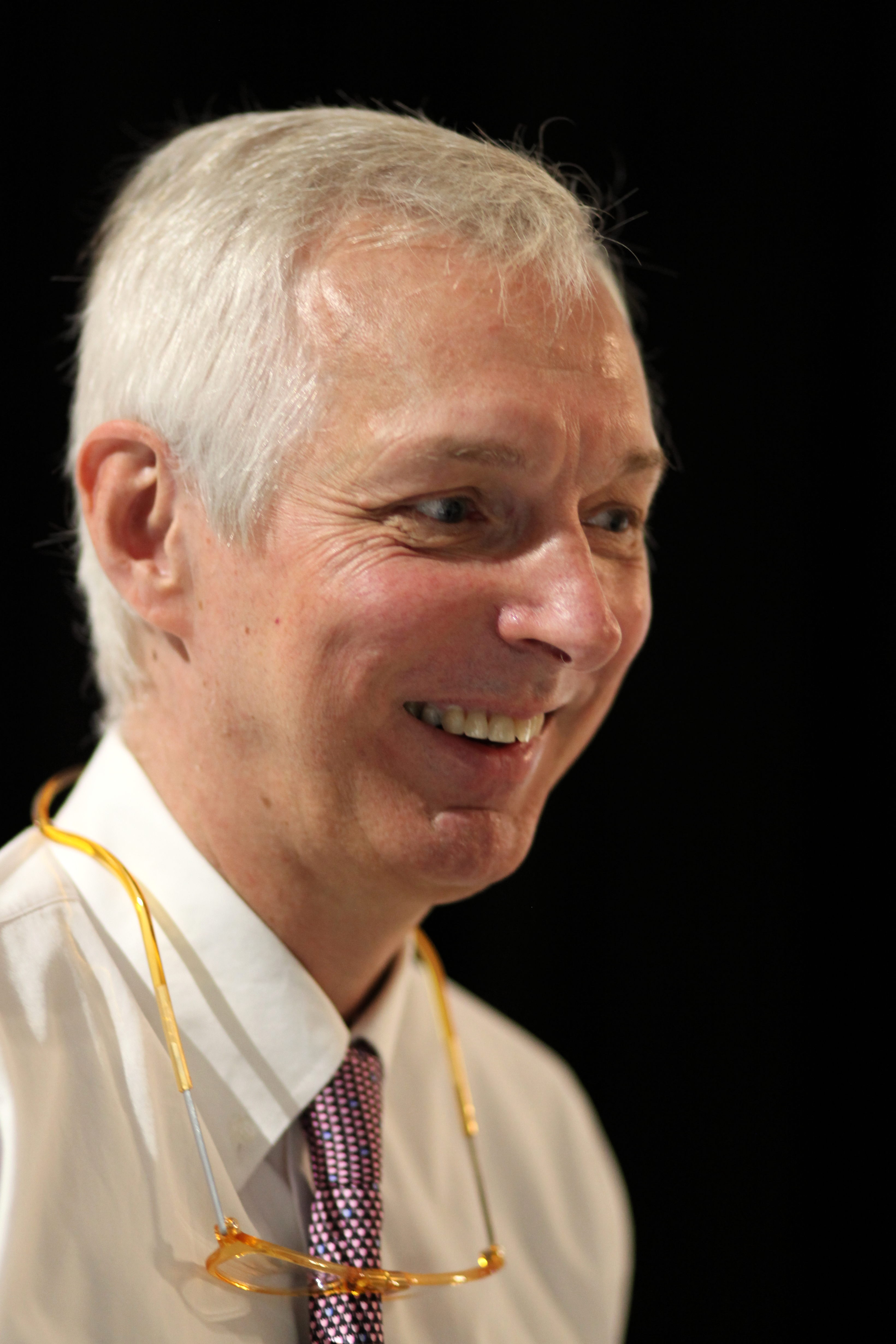
Arjen Klaas Lenstra

Arjen Klaas Lenstra (born 2 March 1956, in Groningen) is a Dutch mathematician, cryptographer and computational number theorist. He is a professor emeritus from the École Polytechnique Fédérale de Lausanne (EPFL) where he headed of the Laboratory for Cryptologic Algorithms.

== Career ==
He studied mathematics at the University of Amsterdam. He is a former professor at the EPFL (Lausanne), in the Laboratory for Cryptologic Algorithms, and previously worked for Citibank and Bell Labs.

== Research ==
Lenstra is active in cryptography and computational number theory, especially in areas such as integer factorization. With Mark Manasse, he was the first to seek volunteers over the internet for a large scale volunteer computing project. Such projects became more common after the Factorization of RSA-129 which was a high publicity distributed factoring success led by Lenstra along with Derek Atkins, Michael Graff and Paul Leyland. He was also a leader in the successful factorizations of several other RSA numbers.

Lenstra was also involved in the development of the number field sieve. With coauthors, he showed the great potential of the algorithm early on by using it to factor the ninth Fermat number, which was far out of reach by other factoring algorithms of the time. He has since been involved with several other number field sieve factorizations including RSA-768.

Lenstra's most widely cited scientific result is the first polynomial time algorithm to factor polynomials with rational coefficients in the seminal paper that introduced the LLL lattice reduction algorithm with Hendrik Willem Lenstra and László Lovász.

Lenstra is also co-inventor of the XTR cryptosystem.

On 1 March 2005, Arjen Lenstra, Xiaoyun Wang, and Benne de Weger of Eindhoven University of Technology demonstrated construction of two X.509 certificates with different public keys and the same MD5 hash, a demonstrably practical hash collision. The construction included private keys for both public keys.

== Distinctions ==
Lenstra is the recipient of the RSA Award for Excellence in Mathematics 2008 Award.

== Private life ==
Lenstra's brother and co-author Hendrik Lenstra is a professor in mathematics at Leiden University and his brother Jan Karel Lenstra is a former director of Centrum Wiskunde & Informatica (CWI).

== See also ==
- L-notation
- General number field sieve
- Schnorr–Seysen–Lenstra algorithm
