= Rational sieve =

Integer factorization algorithm

In mathematics, the rational sieve is a general algorithm for factoring integers into prime factors. It is a special case of the general number field sieve. While it is less efficient than the general algorithm, it is conceptually simpler. It serves as a helpful first step in understanding how the general number field sieve works.

== Method ==
Suppose we are trying to factor the composite number $n$. We choose a bound $B$, and identify the factor base (which we will call $P$), the set of all primes less than or equal to $B$. Next, we search for positive integers $z$ such that both $z$ and $z+n$ are $B$-smooth — i.e. all of their prime factors are in $P$. We can therefore write, for suitable exponents $a_i$ and $b_i$,

$z=\prod_{p_i\,\in\,P} p_i^{a_i} ,\quad\text{and}$

$z+n=\prod_{p_i\in P} p_i^{b_i}.$

But $z$ and $z+n$ are congruent modulo $n$, and so each such integer $z$ that we find yields a multiplicative relation modulo $n$ among the elements of $P$, i.e.

$$\prod_{p_i\,\in\, P} p_i^{a_i} \equiv \prod_{p_i\,\in\, P} p_i^{b_i} \pmod n$$

(where the $a_i$ and $b_i$ are nonnegative integers.)

When we have generated enough of these relations (it is generally sufficient that the number of relations be a few more than the size of $P$), we can use the methods of linear algebra to multiply together these various relations in such a way that the exponents of the primes are all even. This will give us a congruence of squares of the form $a^2\equiv b^2\pmod n$, which can be turned into a factorization of $n=\gcd(a+b,n)\cdot \gcd(a-b,n)$. This factorization might turn out to be trivial (i.e. $n=n\cdot 1$), in which case we have to try again with a different combination of relations, but with luck we will get a nontrivial pair of factors of $n$, and the algorithm will terminate.

== Example ==
We will factor the integer $n=187$ using the rational sieve. We will arbitrarily try the value $B=7$, giving the factor base $P=\{2,3,5,7\}$. The first step is to test $n$ for divisibility by each of the members of $P$; clearly if $n$ is divisible by one of these primes, then we are finished already. However, 187 is not divisible by 2, 3, 5, or 7. Next, we search for suitable values of $z$; the first few are 2, 5, 9, and 56. These four suitable values of $z$ give four multiplicative relations (mod 187):

| $2^1 3^0 5^0 7^0 = 2 \equiv 189 = 2^0 3^3 5^0 7^1$ | 1 |

| $2^0 3^0 5^1 7^0 = 5 \equiv 192 = 2^6 3^1 5^0 7^0$ | 2 |

| $2^0 3^2 5^0 7^0 = 9 \equiv 196 = 2^2 3^0 5^0 7^2$ | 3 |

| $2^3 3^0 5^0 7^1 = 56 \equiv 243 = 2^0 3^5 5^0 7^0$ | 4 |

There are now several essentially different ways to combine these and end up with even exponents. For example,

- (1) $\cdot$ (4): After multiplying these and canceling out the common factor of 7 (which we can do since 7, being a member of $P$, has already been determined to be coprime with $n$), this reduces to $2^4\equiv 3^8\pmod n$. The resulting factorization is .$187=\gcd(3^4+2^2,187)\cdot\gcd(3^4-2^2,187)=11\cdot17$.

Alternatively, equation (3) is in the proper form already:

- (3): This says $3^2\equiv 14^2\pmod n$, which gives the factorization $187=\gcd(14+3,187)\cdot\gcd(14-3,187)=11\cdot17$.

== Limitations of the algorithm ==
Like the general number field sieve, the rational sieve cannot factor numbers of the form $p^m$, where $p$ is a prime and $m$ is an integer. This is not a huge problem, though — such numbers are statistically rare, and moreover there is a simple and fast process to check whether a given number is of this form. Probably the most elegant method is to check whether $\left\lfloor n^{1/b} \right\rfloor^b=n$ holds for any $1<b\leqslant \log_2 n$ using an integer version of Newton's method for the root extraction.

The biggest problem is finding a sufficient number of $z$ such that both $z$ and $z+n$ are $B$-smooth. For any given $B$, the proportion of numbers that are $B$-smooth decreases rapidly with the size of the number. So if $n$ is large (say, a 100 digits), it will be difficult or impossible to find enough $z$ for the algorithm to work. The advantage of the general number field sieve is that one only needs to search for smooth numbers of order $\exp(C(\log n)^{2/3}(\log\log n)^{1/3})$ for some $C>0$, rather than of order $n$ as required here.
