= Michael Graff =

Michael Graff is a co-author and one of several architects of BIND 9. In April 1994, he co-authored The Magic Words are Squeamish Ossifrage.

Graff graduated from Iowa State University with a degree in Computer Engineering. He is currently working at Internet Systems Consortium, a non-profit corporation.
