= Antoine Joux =

French cryptographer

- Born: 12 May 1967 (age 59)
- Education: École Polytechnique
- Awards: Gödel Prize (2013)
- Scientific career
- Fields: Applied mathematics, cryptography
- Workplaces: Versailles Saint-Quentin-en-Yvelines University, Saarbrücken University
- Doctoral advisor: Jacques Stern

Antoine Joux (born 1967) is a French cryptographer, one of the three 2013 Gödel Prize laureates., specifically cited for his paper A one round protocol for tripartite Diffie-Hellman.

He was associate professor at the Université de Versailles Saint-Quentin-en-Yvelines and researcher in the CRYPT team of the laboratory of computer science PRISM of CNRS, then Chair of Cryptology of the Fondation partenariale of UPMC, professeur associé at the Laboratoire d'informatique de Paris 6, and Senior Crypto-Security Expert at CryptoExperts. Currently he is a permanent researcher at the CISPA Helmholtz Center for Information Security in Saarbrücken, Germany, and an honorary professor at Saarbrücken University.
