= Paul Zimmermann (mathematician) =

French mathematician (born 1964)

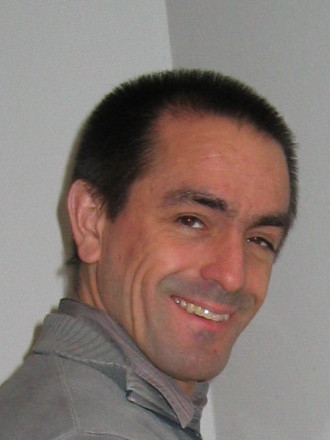
- Paul Zimmermann, January 2006
- Education: Master's degree in computer science
- Alma mater: École polytechnique University Paris VII

Paul Zimmermann (born 13 November 1964) is a French computational mathematician, working at INRIA.

== Education ==
After engineering studies at École polytechnique 1984 to 1987, he got a master's degree in computer science in 1988 from University Paris VII and a magister from École Normale Supérieure in mathematics and computer science. His doctoral degree from École Polytechnique in 1991 was entitled Séries génératrices et analyse automatique d’algorithmes, and advised by Philippe Flajolet.

== Research ==
His interests include asymptotically fast arithmetic.

He has developed some of the fastest available code for manipulating polynomials over GF(2), and for calculating hypergeometric constants to billions of decimal places. He is associated with the CARAMEL project to develop efficient arithmetic, in a general context and in particular in the context of algebraic curves of small genus; arithmetic on polynomials of very large degree turns out to be useful in algorithms for point-counting on such curves. He is also interested in computational number theory. In particular, he has contributed to some of the record computations in integer factorisation and discrete logarithm.

Zimmermann co-authored the book Computational Mathematics, published in 2018 on SageMath used by Mathematical students worldwide.

In 2010, he co-authored a book on algorithms for computer arithmetic with Richard Brent.

He has been an active developer of the GMP-ECM implementation of the elliptic curve method for integer factorisation and of MPFR, an arbitrary precision floating point library with correct rounding. He is also a coauthor of the CADO-NFS software tool, which was used to factor RSA-240 in record time.

In a 2014 blog post, Zimmermann said that he would refuse invitations to review papers submitted to Gold Open Access and hybrid open access journals, because he disagrees with the publication mechanism.
