= Hypergeometric =

Hypergeometric may refer to several distinct concepts within mathematics:

- The hypergeometric function, a solution to the Gaussian hypergeometric differential equation, which provides a general solution to every second-order ordinary differential equation
  - Generalized hypergeometric functions, which generalize the hypergeometric function to specific higher orders
  - General hypergeometric functions, which provide general solution spaces for whole systems of classical hypergeometric functions
- The hypergeometric distribution, a probability distribution which describes the probability of drawing a certain number of successes without replacement from a finite population
- Higher-dimensional geometry, which generalizes three-dimensional geometry into an arbitrary number of dimensions; in this context, the prefix hyper- means "n-dimensional"
- Hypergeometric motives, a form of motive in algebraic geometry
