= Jens Franke =

German mathematician (born 1964)

- Born: 29 June 1964 (age 62)
- Education: University of Jena
- Awards: Oberwolfach Prize (1993); EMS Prize (1992)
- Scientific career
- Fields: Mathematics
- Workplaces: University of Bonn
- Doctoral advisor: Hans Triebel

Jens Franke (born 28 June 1964) is a German mathematician. He has held a chair at the University of Bonn's Hausdorff Center for Mathematics since 1992. Franke's research has covered various problems of number theory, algebraic geometry and analysis on locally symmetric spaces.

Franke attended the University of Jena, where he earned his PhD under Hans Triebel in 1986. He was awarded the EMS Prize in 1992, and the Oberwolfach Prize in 1993.

In recent years, Franke worked on an implementation of the Number Field Sieve algorithm for prime decomposition. In May 2007, he and his colleague Thorsten Kleinjung announced the factorization of M_{1039}, the 1,039th Mersenne number.
