= Christof Paar =

German cryptographer

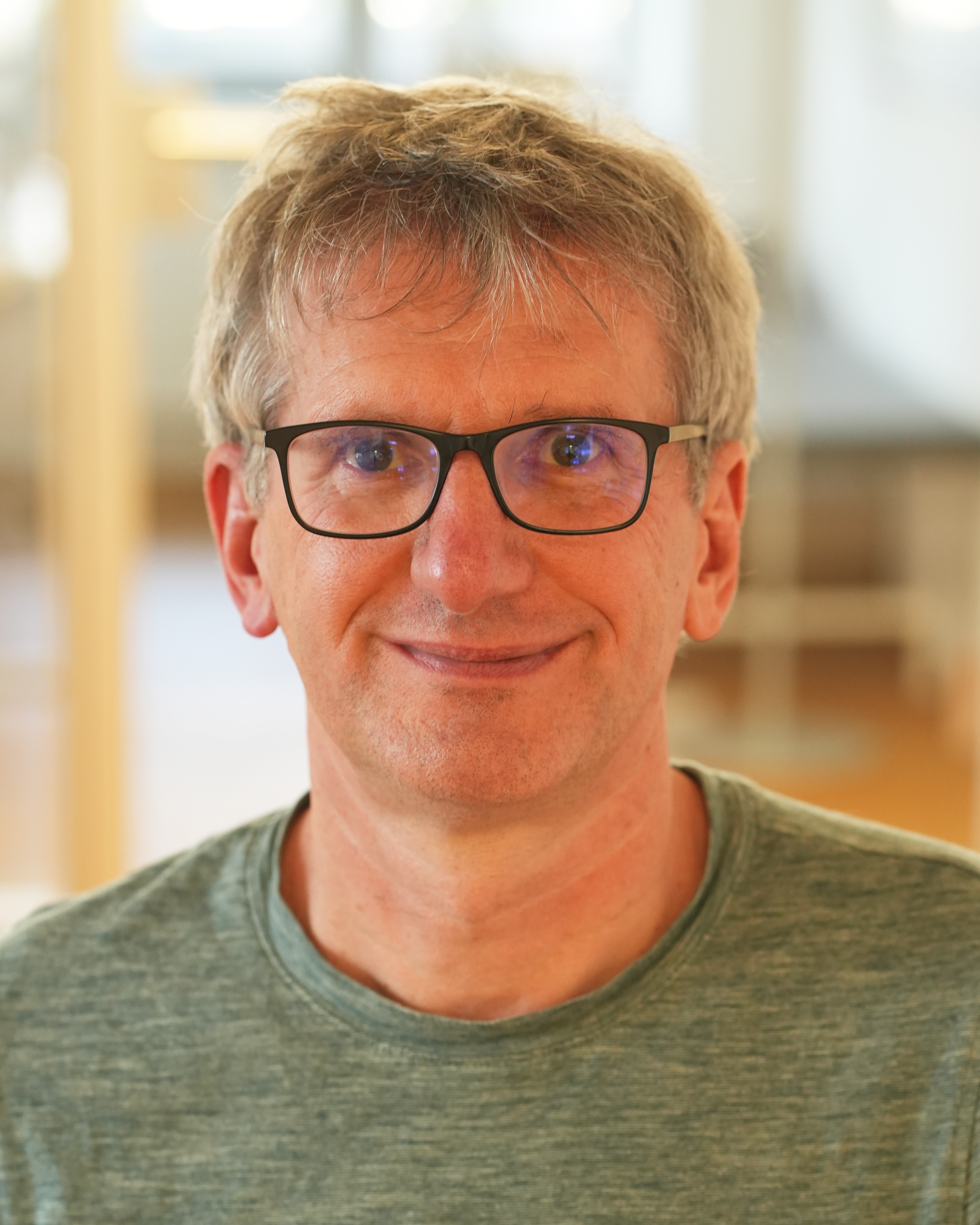
Christof Paar

Christof Paar (born July 18, 1963, in Cologne) is a German cryptographer. He is one of the founding directors at the Max Planck Institute for Security and Privacy in Bochum, Germany, a "Scientific Member" of the Max Planck Society, IEEE Fellow, and a member of the German National Academy of Sciences Leopoldina.

== Life and career ==
After training as a telecommunications technician, Christof Paar studied telecommunication engineering at the Cologne University of Applied Sciences (then FH Köln) from 1984 to 1988. After his civilian service, he studied electrical engineering with a specialization in computer technology at the University of Siegen from 1989 to 1991. He wrote his diploma thesis at Michigan Technological University on active noise control. From 1991 to 1994, he was a doctoral student with Han Vinck at the Institute for Experimental Mathematics at the University of Duisburg-Essen (then the University of Essen). His dissertation was on computer architectures for arithmetic in finite fields. From 1995 to 2001, he was an assistant and later an associate professor at Worcester Polytechnic Institute in Massachusetts for nearly seven years. From 2001 to 2019, he held the Chair of Embedded Security at Ruhr University Bochum, Germany. From 2008 to 2009 and from 2014 to 2016, he worked as a Research Professor at the University of Massachusetts Amherst. Since 2019, he is one of the two founding directors of the new Max Planck Institute for Security and Privacy in Bochum.

Paar's research deals with the engineering aspects of cryptography. He has significantly contributed to efficient implementing symmetric and asymmetric crypto algorithms, side-channel analysis, embedded systems security, and hardware security. In 1999, he co-founded, with Çetin Koç, CHES (Conference on Cryptographic Hardware and Embedded Systems) at WPI, which has become one of the leading international conferences on cryptography. At Ruhr University Bochum, he established the Horst Görtz Institute for Information Security together with Hans Dobbertin and was instrumental in building Bochum's bachelor's and master's degree programs in the field of IT security. Since 2019, he is co-spokesperson for the Cluster of Excellence "CASA - Cyber Security in the Age of Large-Scale Attackers", together with Eike Kiltz and Angela Sasse. In 2003, Paar founded Escrypt GmbH together with Willi Mannheims, one of the first companies to focus on industrial data security. Since 2012, Escrypt has been part of Robert Bosch GmbH.

== Awards and honors ==
- 1998 NSF CAREER Award
- 2010 German IT Security Award (with Gregor Leander and Axel Poschmann) of the Horst Görtz Foundation for the cipher Present
- 2011 IEEE Fellow
- 2012 Innovation Award NRW
- 2013 DHL Innovation Award (with Gregor Leander und Axel Poschmann)
- 2016 ERC Advanced Grant EPoCH
- 2017 IACR Fellow (International Association for Cryptologic Research)
- 2019 Admission as a member of the German National Academy of Sciences Leopoldina
- 2021 Ring of honor of the city of Bochum
- 2023 Karl Heinz Beckurts Prize
- 2026 UNIPRENEURS Prize
- 2026 CHES Test of Time Award

== Bibliography ==
- Christof Paar, Jan Pelzl, Tim Güneysu: Understanding Cryptography: From Established Symmetric and Asymmetric Ciphers to Post-Quantum Algorithms. 2nd Edition. Springer 2024, ISBN 978-3662690062
- Christof Paar, Jan Pelzl: Kryptographie verständlich. 1. Auflage. Springer Verlag, Berlin/Heidelberg 2016, ISBN 978-3-662-49297-0
- PRESENT: An Ultra-Lightweight Block Cipher

== Web links ==
- Member Entry of Christof Paar at the German National Academy of Sciences Leopoldina
- EMSEC – Embedded Security Group.
- Lecture Recordings of "Introduction to Cryptography"
