= Paul Leyland =

British number theorist

Paul Leyland is a British astronomer and number theorist who has studied integer factorization and primality testing.

He has contributed to the factorization of RSA-129, RSA-140, and RSA-155, as well as potential factorial primes as large as 400! + 1. He has also studied Cunningham numbers, Cullen numbers, Woodall numbers, etc., and numbers of the form $x^y + y^x$, which are now called Leyland numbers. He was involved with the NFSNet project to use distributed computing on the Internet from 2005 to 2008.
