= Derek Atkins =

American computer scientist

Derek A Atkins is a computer scientist specializing in computer security. He studied electrical engineering and computer science at the Massachusetts Institute of Technology. In June 2014, he became the chief technology officer of SecureRF.

Atkins is an author or co-author of several computer security books, including Internet Security Professional Reference and Reputational Risk: A Question of Trust. In April 1994, he co-authored the paper The Magic Words are Squeamish Ossifrage detailing the factorization of RSA-129.
