= VSH =

VSH may refer to:

== Mathematics ==
- Vector spherical harmonics
- Very smooth hash, in cryptography

== Media and entertainment ==
- VSH News, a Pakistani television station
- XrossMediaBar (Sony codename: VSH)

== Other uses ==
- VSH project, to develop suborbital spacecraft
- Varroa sensitive hygiene, in bees
- company stock code for Vishay Intertechnology
