= Williams's p + 1 algorithm =

Integer factorization algorithm

In computational number theory, Williams's p + 1 algorithm is an integer factorization algorithm, one of the family of algebraic-group factorisation algorithms. It was invented by Hugh C. Williams in 1982.

It works well if the number N to be factored contains one or more prime factors p such that p + 1 is smooth, i.e. p + 1 contains only small factors. It uses Lucas sequences to perform exponentiation in a quadratic field.

It is analogous to Pollard's p − 1 algorithm. In fact, it is also able to find p if p − 1 is smooth, in which case it degenerates into a slow version of Pollard's algorithm.

== Algorithm ==
Choose some integer A greater than 2 which characterizes the Lucas sequence:

$$V_0=2, V_1=A, V_j=AV_{j-1}-V_{j-2}$$

where all operations are performed modulo N.

Then any odd prime p divides $\gcd(N,V_M-2)$ whenever M is a multiple of $p-(D/p)$, where $D=A^2-4$ and $(D/p)$ is the Jacobi symbol.

For different values of M we calculate $\gcd(N,V_M-2)$, and when the result is not equal to 1 or to N, we have found a non-trivial factor of N.

To find a p with a smooth p + 1 we require that $(D/p)=-1$, that is, D should be a quadratic non-residue modulo p. But as we don't know p beforehand, trying more than one value of A may be required before finding a solution. If $(D/p)=+1$, this algorithm degenerates into a slow version of Pollard's p − 1 algorithm. This happens 50% of the time.

=== Calculation of Lucas terms ===
The values of M used are successive factorials, and $V_M$ is the M-th value of the sequence characterized by $V_{M-1}$. To find the M-th element V of the sequence characterized by B, we proceed in a manner similar to left-to-right exponentiation:

x := B           
y := (B ^ 2 − 2) mod N     
for each bit of M to the right of the most significant bit do
    if the bit is 1 then
        x := (x × y − B) mod N 
        y := (y ^ 2 − 2) mod N 
    else
        y := (x × y − B) mod N 
        x := (x ^ 2 − 2) mod N 
V := x

=== Continuation ===
There is a "second stage" extension to William's p+1 algorithm much like there is for p-1 and Lenstra ECM. After the steps above (which is now called a "stage 1"), a continuation allows one to find p+1 with a relaxed condition: instead of requiring that p + 1 has all its factors less than B, we require it to have all but one of its factors less than some B_{1} (same as the regular B), and the remaining factor less than some B_{2} ≫ B_{1}.

== Example ==
With N=112729 and A=5, successive values of $V_M$ are:

V_{1} of seq(5) = V_{1!} of seq(5) = 5
V_{2} of seq(5) = V_{2!} of seq(5) = 23
V_{3} of seq(23) = V_{3!} of seq(5) = 12098
V_{4} of seq(12098) = V_{4!} of seq(5) = 87680
V_{5} of seq(87680) = V_{5!} of seq(5) = 53242
V_{6} of seq(53242) = V_{6!} of seq(5) = 27666
V_{7} of seq(27666) = V_{7!} of seq(5) = 110229.

At this point, gcd(110229-2,112729) = 139, so 139 is a non-trivial factor of 112729. Notice that p+1 = 140 = 2^{2} × 5 × 7. The number 7! is the lowest factorial which is multiple of 140, so the proper factor 139 is found in this step.

Using another initial value, say A = 9, we get:

V_{1} of seq(9) = V_{1!} of seq(9) = 9
V_{2} of seq(9) = V_{2!} of seq(9) = 79
V_{3} of seq(79) = V_{3!} of seq(9) = 41886
V_{4} of seq(41886) = V_{4!} of seq(9) = 79378
V_{5} of seq(79378) = V_{5!} of seq(9) = 1934
V_{6} of seq(1934) = V_{6!} of seq(9) = 10582
V_{7} of seq(10582) = V_{7!} of seq(9) = 84241
V_{8} of seq(84241) = V_{8!} of seq(9) = 93973
V_{9} of seq(93973) = V_{9!} of seq(9) = 91645.

At this point gcd(91645-2,112729) = 811, so 811 is a non-trivial factor of 112729. Notice that p−1 = 810 = 2 × 5 × 3^{4}. The number 9! is the lowest factorial which is multiple of 810, so the proper factor 811 is found in this step. The factor 139 is not found this time because p−1 = 138 = 2 × 3 × 23 which is not a divisor of 9!

As can be seen in these examples we do not know in advance whether the prime that will be found has a smooth p+1 or p−1.

== Generalization ==
Based on Pollard's p − 1 and Williams's p+1 factoring algorithms, Eric Bach and Jeffrey Shallit developed techniques to factor n efficiently provided that it has a prime factor p such that any k^{th} cyclotomic polynomial Φ_{k}(p) is smooth. The first few cyclotomic polynomials are given by the sequence Φ_{1}(p) = p−1, Φ_{2}(p) = p+1, Φ_{3}(p) = p^{2}+p+1, and Φ_{4}(p) = p^{2}+1.
