= Dickman function =

Mathematical function

The Dickman–de Bruijn function ρ(u) plotted on a logarithmic scale. The horizontal axis is the argument u, and the vertical axis is the value of the function. The graph nearly makes a downward line on the logarithmic scale, demonstrating that the logarithm of the function is quasilinear.

In analytic number theory, the Dickman function or Dickman–de Bruijn function ρ is a special function used to estimate the proportion of smooth numbers up to a given bound. It was first studied by actuary Karl Dickman, who defined it in his only mathematical publication. It was later studied by the Dutch mathematician Nicolaas Govert de Bruijn.

== Definition ==
The Dickman–de Bruijn function $\rho(u)$ is a continuous function that satisfies the delay differential equation

$$u\rho'(u) + \rho(u-1) = 0\,$$

with initial conditions $\rho(u) = 1$ for 0 ≤ u ≤ 1.

== Properties ==
Dickman proved that, when $a$ is fixed, we have

$$\Psi(x, x^{1/a})\sim x\rho(a)\,$$

where $\Psi(x,y)$ is the number of y-smooth (or y-friable) integers below x. Equivalently, the number of $B$-smooth numbers less than $N$ is about
$$\Psi(N,B) \approx N \rho\left(\frac{\log N}{\log B}\right).$$

Ramaswami later gave a rigorous proof that for fixed a, $\Psi(x,x^{1/a})$ was asymptotic to $x \rho(a)$, with the error bound

$$\Psi(x,x^{1/a})=x\rho(a)+O(x/\log x)$$

in big O notation.

Knuth gives a proof for a narrowed bound:

$$\Psi(x,x^{1/a})=x\rho(a)+(1-\gamma)\rho(a-1)(x/\log x)+O(x/{(\log x)}^2)$$

where γ is Euler's constant.

== Applications ==
The Dickman–de Bruijn used to calculate the probability that the largest and 2nd largest factor of x is less than x^a

The main purpose of the Dickman–de Bruijn function is to estimate the frequency of smooth numbers at a given size. This can be used to optimize various number-theoretical algorithms such as P–1 factoring and can be useful of its own right.

It can be shown that

$$\Psi(x,y)=xu^{O(-u)}$$

which is related to the estimate $\rho(u)\approx u^{-u}$ below.

The Golomb–Dickman constant has an alternate definition in terms of the Dickman–de Bruijn function.

== Estimation ==
A first approximation might be $\rho(u)\approx u^{-u}.\,$ A better estimate is

$$\rho(u)\sim \frac 1 {\xi\sqrt{2\pi u}} \cdot \exp(-u\xi+\operatorname{Ei}(\xi))$$

where Ei is the exponential integral and ξ is the positive root of

$$e^\xi-1=u\xi.\,$$

A simple upper bound is $\rho(x)\le1/x!.$

$u$	$\rho(u)$
1	1
2	3.0685282×10^{−1}
3	4.8608388×10^{−2}
4	4.9109256×10^{−3}
5	3.5472470×10^{−4}
6	1.9649696×10^{−5}
7	8.7456700×10^{−7}
8	3.2320693×10^{−8}
9	1.0162483×10^{−9}
10	2.7701718×10^{−11}

== Computation ==
For each interval [n − 1, n] with n an integer, there is an analytic function $\rho_n$ such that $\rho_n(u)=\rho(u)$. For 0 ≤ u ≤ 1, $\rho(u) = 1$. For 1 ≤ u ≤ 2, $\rho(u) = 1-\log u$. For 2 ≤ u ≤ 3,

$$\rho(u) = 1-(1-\log(u-1))\log(u) + \operatorname{Li}_2(1 - u) + \frac{\pi^2}{12}.$$

with Li_{2} the dilogarithm. Other $\rho_n$ can be calculated using infinite series.

An alternate method is computing lower and upper bounds with the trapezoidal rule; a mesh of progressively finer sizes allows for arbitrary accuracy. For high precision calculations (hundreds of digits), a recursive series expansion about the midpoints of the intervals is superior. Values for u ≤ 7 can be usefully computed via numerical integration in ordinary double-precision floating-point.

== Extension ==
Friedlander defines a two-dimensional analog $\sigma(u,v)$ of $\rho(u)$. This function is used to estimate a function $\Psi(x,y,z)$ similar to de Bruijn's, but counting the number of y-smooth integers with at most one prime factor greater than z. Then

$$\Psi(x,x^{1/a},x^{1/b})\sim x\sigma(b,a).\,$$

This class of numbers may be encountered in the two-stage variant of P-1 factoring. However, Kruppa's estimate of the probability of finding a factor by P-1 does not make use of this result.

== See also ==
- Buchstab function, a function used similarly to estimate the number of rough numbers, whose convergence to $e^{-\gamma}$ is controlled by the Dickman function
- Golomb–Dickman constant
- Poisson-Dirichlet distribution
