= Gregory Freiman =

Russian and Israeli mathematician (1926–2024)

Gregory Abelevich Freiman
- Григорий Абелевич Фрейман
- Born: 3 July 1926; Kazan, Russia
- Died: 19 September 2024 (aged 98); Tel Aviv, Israel
- Education: Moscow University, Kazan University
- Known for: Freiman's theorem, Additive number theory
- Scientific career
- Fields: Mathematics
- Workplaces: Tel Aviv University
- Doctoral advisor: Alexander Gelfond, Alexey G. Postnikov, Alexander Buchstab

Gregory Abelevich Freiman (Russian: Григорий Абелевич Фрейман; 3 July 1926 – 19 September 2024) was a Russian and Israeli mathematician known for his work in additive number theory, in particular, for proving Freiman's theorem. He was a professor emeritus in Tel Aviv University.

== Biography ==
Freiman was born in Kazan on 3 July 1926. He graduated from Moscow University in 1949, and obtained his Candidate of Sciences in Kazan University in 1956. From 1956 he worked in Elabuga, and in 1965 he defended his Doctor of Sciences degree under the joint supervision of Alexander Gelfond, Alexey G. Postnikov, and Alexander Buchstab. From 1967 he worked in Vladimir, and later in Kalinin (now Tver).

In the 1970s and early 1980s Freiman participated in the refusenik movement. His samizdat essay It seems I am a Jew, described the discrimination against Jewish mathematicians in the Soviet Union. It was published in the US in 1980.

Later, Freiman was driven out of Russia for his different views. He chose Israel as his new home country, leaving his son, daughter and wife. In Israel he became professor in Tel Aviv University and remarried.

Freiman died on 19 September 2024, at the age of 98.

== Selected publications ==
- Freiman, G.A. (1973). Foundations of a structural theory of set addition. Translations of Mathematical Monographs. Vol. 37. American Mathematical Society.
- with Boris M. Schein: Freiman, Gregory A.; Schein, Boris M. (1991). "Interconnections between the structure theory of set addition and rewritability in groups". Proc. Amer. Math. Soc. 113 (4): 899–910. doi:10.1090/s0002-9939-1991-1072338-3. MR 1072338.
- Freiman, G. A. (1999). "Structure Theory of Set Addition". Astérisque. 258: 1–33. MR 1701187.
- with Boris L. Granovsky: Freiman, Gregory A.; Granovsky, Boris L. (2005). "Clustering in coagulation-fragmentation processes, combinatorial structures and additive number systems: Asymptotic formulae and limiting laws". Trans. Amer. Math. Soc. 357 (6): 2483–2507. arXiv:math/0207265. doi:10.1090/s0002-9947-04-03617-7. MR 2140447.
- Freiman, Gregory A. (2012). "On finite subsets of nonabelian groups with small doubling". Proc. Amer. Math. Soc. 140 (9): 2997–3002. doi:10.1090/s0002-9939-2012-11156-6.
