= Buchstab function =

Mathematical function

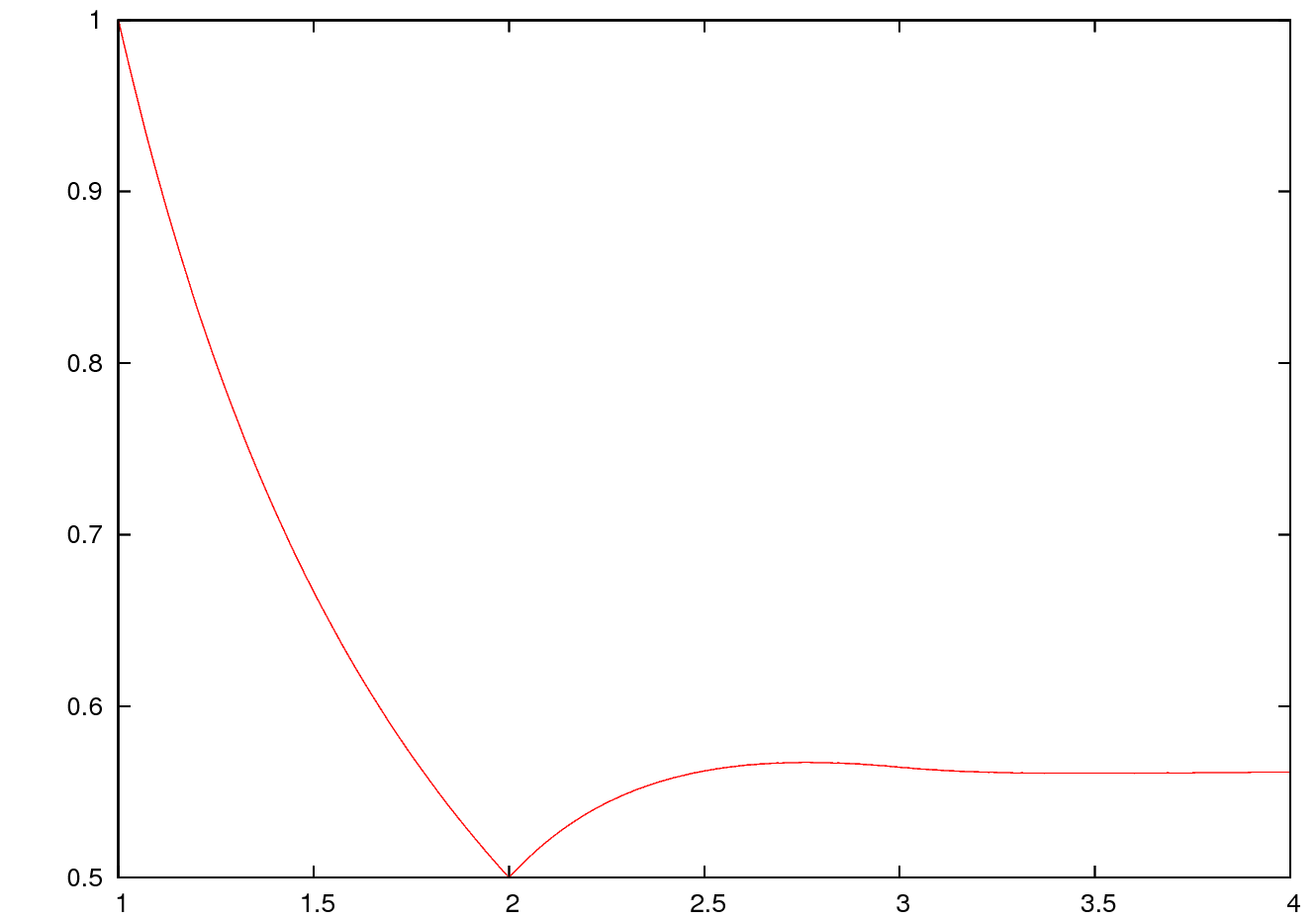
Graph of the Buchstab function ω(u) from u = 1 to u = 4.

The Buchstab function (or Buchstab's function) is the unique continuous function $\omega: \R_{\ge 1}\rightarrow \R_{>0}$ defined by the delay differential equation

$$\omega(u)=\frac{1}{u}, \qquad\qquad\qquad 1\le u\le 2,$$
$${\frac{d}{du}} (u\omega(u))=\omega(u-1), \qquad u\ge 2.$$

In the second equation, the derivative at u = 2 should be taken as u approaches 2 from the right. It is named after Alexander Buchstab, who wrote about it in 1937.

== Asymptotics ==
The Buchstab function approaches $e^{-\gamma} \approx 0.561$ rapidly as $u\to\infty,$ where $\gamma$ is the Euler–Mascheroni constant. In fact,

$$|\omega(u)-e^{-\gamma}|\le \frac{\rho(u-1)}{u}, \qquad u\ge 1,$$

where ρ is the Dickman function. Also, $\omega(u)-e^{-\gamma}$ oscillates in a regular way, alternating between extrema and zeroes; the extrema alternate between positive maxima and negative minima. The interval between consecutive extrema approaches 1 as u approaches infinity, as does the interval between consecutive zeroes.

== Applications ==
The Buchstab function is used to count rough numbers. If Φ(x, y) is the number of positive integers less than or equal to x with no prime factor less than y, then for any fixed u > 1,

$$\Phi(x,x^{1/u}) \sim \omega(u)\frac{x}{\log x^{1/u}}, \qquad x\to\infty.$$
