= Rough number =

Positive integer with large prime factors

A k-rough number, as defined by Finch in 2001 and 2003, is a positive integer whose prime factors are all greater than or equal to k. k-roughness has alternately been defined as requiring all prime factors to strictly exceed k.

== Examples (after Finch) ==
1. Every odd positive integer is 3-rough.
2. Every positive integer that is congruent to 1 or 5 mod 6 is 5-rough.
3. Every positive integer is 2-rough, since all its prime factors, being prime numbers, exceed 1.

== Powerrough numbers ==
Like powersmooth numbers, we define "n-powerrough numbers" as the numbers whose prime factorization $p_1^{r_1} \cdot p_2^{r_2} \cdot p_3^{r_3} \cdot \dots p_k^{r_k}$ has $p_i^{r_i} \ge n$ for every $1 \le i \le k$ (while the condition is $p_i^{r_i} \le n$ for n-powersmooth numbers), e.g. every positive integer is 2-powerrough, 3-powerrough numbers are exactly the numbers not == 2 mod 4, 4-powerrough numbers are exactly the numbers neither == 2 mod 4 nor == 3, 6 mod 9, 5-powerrough numbers are exactly the numbers neither == 2, 4, 6 mod 8 nor == 3, 6 mod 9, etc.

== Sequences ==
The On-Line Encyclopedia of Integer Sequences (OEIS) lists p-rough numbers for small p:

- 2-rough numbers: A000027
- 3-rough numbers: A005408
- 5-rough numbers: A007310
- 7-rough numbers: A007775
- 11-rough numbers: A008364
- 13-rough numbers: A008365
- 17-rough numbers: A008366
- 19-rough numbers: A166061
- 23-rough numbers: A166063

== See also ==
- Buchstab function, used to count rough numbers
- Smooth number
