= Alexander Buchstab =

- Born: October 4, 1905; Stavropol
- Died: February 27, 1990 (aged 84)
- Education: Moscow State University
- Known for: Buchstab function
- Scientific career
- Fields: Mathematics
- Workplaces: Moscow State Pedagogical Institute
- Doctoral advisor: Aleksandr Khinchin
- Doctoral students: Gregory Freiman; Ilya Piatetski-Shapiro

Aleksandr Adol'fovich Buchstab (October 4, 1905 – February 27, 1990; Russian: Александр Адольфович Бухштаб, variously transliterated as Bukhstab, Buhštab, or Bukhshtab) was a Soviet mathematician who worked in number theory and was "known for his work in sieve methods". He is the namesake of the Buchstab function, which he wrote about in 1937.

== Life and career ==
Buchstab was born in Stavropol; his father was a physician. He studied at the Rostov Polytechnic Institute and Rostov University before moving to the faculty of mechanics and mathematics at Moscow State University, where he earned a degree in 1928. He worked at the Moscow Higher Technical College from 1928 until 1930, and then from 1930 to 1939 at Azerbaijan University, where was the chair of algebra and function theory and then dean of physics and mathematics.

During this period, Buchstab also did graduate studies at Moscow State under the supervision of Aleksandr Khinchin. He defended his candidacy in 1939, and at that time was appointed to a professorship at the Moscow State Pedagogical University. During World War II he taught at the Azerbaijan State University and Dzerzhinskii Higher Naval Engineering College, returning to Moscow in 1943 and defending a doctorate from the Steklov Institute of Mathematics in 1944. He remained at the Moscow State Pedagogical University for the rest of his career, where his students included Gregory Freiman and Ilya Piatetski-Shapiro.

== Selected publications ==
- Бухштаб, А. А. (1937), "Асимптотическая оценка одной общей теоретикочисловой функции" [Asymptotic estimation of a general number-theoretic function], Matematicheskii Sbornik (in Russian), 2(44) (6): 1239–1246, Zbl 0018.24504
