= Generic character =

Generic character may refer to:

- Generic character (mathematics), a character on a class group of binary quadratic forms
