= Universal quadratic form =

In mathematics, a universal quadratic form is a quadratic form over a ring that represents every element of the ring. A non-singular form over a field which represents zero non-trivially is universal.

== Examples ==
- Over the real numbers, the form $x^2$ in one variable is not universal, as it cannot represent negative numbers: the two-variable form $x^2-y^2$ over $\R$ is universal.
- Lagrange's four-square theorem states that every positive integer is the sum of four squares. Hence the form $x^2 + y^2 + z^2 + t^2 - u^2$ over $\Z$ is universal.
- Over a finite field, any non-singular quadratic form of dimension 2 or more is universal.

== Forms over the rational numbers ==
The Hasse–Minkowski theorem implies that a form is universal over $\Q$ if and only if it is universal over Q_{p} for all primes $p$ (where we include $p=\infty$, letting $\Q_\infty$ denote $\R$). A form over $\R$ is universal if and only if it is not definite; a form over $\Q_p$ is universal if it has dimension at least 4. One can conclude that all indefinite forms of dimension at least 4 over $\Q$ are universal.

== See also ==
- The 15 and 290 theorems give conditions for a quadratic form to represent all positive integers.
