= The Equidistribution of Lattice Shapes of Rings of Integers of Cubic, Quartic, and Quintic Number Fields =

Mathematics book by Piper Harron

The Equidistribution of Lattice Shapes of Rings of Integers of Cubic, Quartic, and Quintic Number Fields: An Artist's Rendering
- Author: Piper H
- Publisher: Birkhäuser Basel
- Publication date: 2016
- ISBN: 978-3-319-76531-0

The Equidistribution of Lattice Shapes of Rings of Integers of Cubic, Quartic, and Quintic Number Fields: An Artist's Rendering is a mathematics book by Piper Harron (also known as Piper H and Piper Harris), based on her Princeton University doctoral thesis of the same title. It has been described as "feminist", "unique", "honest", "generous", and "refreshing".

== Thesis and reception ==
Harron was advised by Fields Medalist Manjul Bhargava, and her thesis deals with the properties of number fields, specifically the shape of their rings of integers. Harron and Bhargava showed that, viewed as a lattice in real vector space, the ring of integers of a random number field does not have any special symmetries. Rather than simply presenting the proof, Harron intended for the thesis and book to explain both the mathematics and the process (and struggle) that was required to reach this result.

The writing is accessible and informal, and the book features sections targeting three different audiences: laypeople, people with general mathematical knowledge, and experts in number theory. Harron intentionally departs from the typical academic format as she is writing for a community of mathematicians who "do not feel that they are encouraged to be themselves". Unusually for a mathematics thesis, Harron intersperses her rigorous analysis and proofs with cartoons, poetry, pop-culture references, and humorous diagrams. Science writer Evelyn Lamb, in Scientific American, expresses admiration for Harron for explaining the process behind the mathematics in a way that is accessible to non-mathematicians, especially "because as a woman of color, she could pay a higher price for doing it." Mathematician Philip Ording calls her approach to communicating mathematical abstractions "generous".

Her thesis went viral in late 2015, especially within the mathematical community, in part because of the prologue which begins by stating that "respected research math is dominated by men of a certain attitude". Harron had left academia for several years, later saying that she found the atmosphere oppressive and herself miserable and verging on failure. She returned determined that, even if she did not do math the "right way", she "could still contribute to the community". Her prologue states that the community lacks diversity and discourages diversity of thought. "It is not my place to make the system comfortable with itself", she concludes.

A concise proof was published in Compositio Mathematica in 2016.
