= John Wrench =

Mathematician

- Born: October 13, 1911; Westfield, New York
- Died: February 27, 2009 (aged 97); Frederick, Maryland
- Education: University at Buffalo; Yale University
- Known for: Computing π
- Scientific career
- Fields: Mathematics
- Workplaces: David Taylor Model Basin

John William Wrench, Jr. (October 13, 1911 – February 27, 2009) was an American mathematician who worked primarily in numerical analysis. He was a pioneer in using computers for mathematical calculations, and is noted for work done with Daniel Shanks to calculate the mathematical constant pi to 100,000 decimal places.

== Life and education ==
Wrench was born on October 13, 1911, in Westfield, New York, and grew up in Hamburg, New York. He received a BA summa cum laude in mathematics in 1933 and an MA in mathematics in 1935, both from the University at Buffalo. He received his PhD in mathematics in 1938 from Yale University. His thesis was titled The derivation of arctangent relations.

Wrench died on February 27, 2009, of pneumonia in Frederick, Maryland.

== Career ==
Wrench started his career teaching at George Washington University, but switched to doing research for the United States Navy during World War II. His specialty for the Navy was developing high-speed computational methods, and he was a pioneer in using computers for mathematical calculations. He worked on projects involving underwater sound waves, underwater explosions, structural design, hydrodynamics, aerodynamics, and data analysis. He became deputy head of the Applied Mathematics Laboratory at the Navy's David Taylor Model Basin in 1953, and retired in 1974 as the head of the laboratory. He also had academic appointments at Yale University, Wesleyan University, University of Maryland, College Park, and American University.

Wrench had a particular interest in computing the decimal digits of π, and performed some lengthy calculations even before the availability of computers. During the period 1945–1956 Wrench and Levi B. Smith used a desk calculator to produce more and more digits of π, ending with 1160 places. In 1961, Wrench and Daniel Shanks used an IBM 7090 computer to calculate π to 100,000 digits. Harry Polachek had a printout of the 100,000 digits specially bound, inscribed in gold letters, and donated to the Smithsonian Institution.

Wrench also calculated a number of other mathematical constants to high precision, for example the Euler–Mascheroni constant γ to 328 decimal places and Khinchin's constant to 65 places.

He was the editor of the Journal of Mathematics of Computation from 1959 to 1978. Wrench was a member of the National Academy of Sciences and the National Research Council. He published more than 150 scientific papers.
