= Bhargava factorial =

Generalization of the mathematical factorial

In mathematics, Bhargava's factorial function, or simply the Bhargava factorial, is a generalization of the factorial function developed by Manjul Bhargava as part of his bachelor's thesis at Harvard University in 1996. Bhargava subsequently published a revised version in The American Mathematical Monthly in 2000. The Bhargava factorial has the property that many number-theoretic results involving the ordinary factorials remain true even when the factorials are replaced by the Bhargava factorials. Using an arbitrary infinite subset S of the set $\mathbb{Z}$ of integers, Bhargava associated a positive integer with every positive integer k, which he denoted by k !_{S}, with the property that if one takes S = $\mathbb{Z}$ itself, then the integer associated with k, that is k !_{$\mathbb{Z}$}, would turn out to be the ordinary factorial of k.

== Motivation for the generalization ==
The factorial of a non-negative integer n, denoted by n!, is the product of all positive integers less than or equal to n. For example, 5! = 5×4×3×2×1 = 120. By convention, the value of 0! is defined as 1. This classical factorial function appears prominently in many theorems in number theory. The following are a few of these theorems.

1. For any positive integers m and n, (m + n)! is a multiple of m! n!.
2. Let f(x) be a primitive integer polynomial, that is, a polynomial in which the coefficients are integers and are relatively prime to each other. If the degree of f(x) is k then the greatest common divisor of the set of values of f(x) for integer values of x is a divisor of k!.
3. Let a_{0}, a_{1}, a_{2}, ... , a_{n} be any n + 1 integers. Then the product of their pairwise differences is a multiple of 0! 1! ... n!.
4. Let $\mathbb{Z}$ be the set of integers and n any integer. Then the number of polynomial functions from the ring of integers $\mathbb{Z}$ to the quotient ring $\mathbb{Z}/n\mathbb{Z}$ is given by $\prod_{k=0}^{n-1} \frac{n}{\gcd(n,k!)}$.

Bhargava posed to himself the following problem and obtained an affirmative answer: In the above theorems, can one replace the set of integers by some other set S (a subset of $\mathbb{Z}$, or a subset of some ring) and define a function depending on S which assigns a value to each non-negative integer k, denoted by k!_{S}, such that the statements obtained from the theorems given earlier by replacing k! by k!_{S} remain true?

== The generalisation ==
- Let S be an arbitrary infinite subset of the set Z of integers.
- Choose a prime number p.
- Construct an ordered sequence {a_{0}, a_{1}, a_{2}, ... } of numbers chosen from S as follows (such a sequence is called a p-ordering of S):

1. a_{0} is any arbitrary element of S.
2. a_{1} is any arbitrary element of S such that the highest power of p that divides a_{1} − a_{0} is minimum.
3. a_{2} is any arbitrary element of S such that the highest power of p that divides (a_{2} − a_{0})(a_{2} − a_{1}) is minimum.
4. a_{3} is any arbitrary element of S such that the highest power of p that divides (a_{3} − a_{0})(a_{3} − a_{1})(a_{3} − a_{2}) is minimum.
5. ... and so on.

- Construct a p-ordering of S for each prime number p. (For a given prime number p, the p-ordering of S is not unique.)
- For each non-negative integer k, let v_{k}(S, p) be the highest power of p that divides (a_{k} − a_{0})(a_{k} − a_{1})(a_{k} − a_{2}) ... (a_{k} − a_{k − 1}). The sequence {v_{0}(S, p), v_{1}(S, p), v_{2}(S, p), v_{3}(S, p), ... } is called the associated p-sequence of S. This is independent of any particular choice of p-ordering of S. (We assume that v_{0}(S, p) = 1 always.)
- The factorial of the integer k, associated with the infinite set S, is defined as $k!_{S}=\prod_p v_k(S,p)$, where the product is taken over all prime numbers p.

== Example: Factorials using set of prime numbers ==
Let S be the set of all prime numbers P = {2, 3, 5, 7, 11, ... }.

- Choose p = 2 and form a p-ordering of P.

- Choose a_{0} = 19 arbitrarily from P.
- To choose a_{1}:

- The highest power of p that divides 2 − a_{0} = −17 is 2^{0} = 1. Also, for any a ≠ 2 in P, a − a_{0} is divisible by 2. Hence, the highest power of p that divides (a_{1} − a_{0}) is minimum when a_{1} = 2 and the minimum power is 1. Thus a_{1} is chosen as 2 and v_{1}(P, 2) = 1.

- To choose a_{2}:

- It can be seen that for each element a in P, the product x = (a − a_{0})(a − a_{1}) = (a − 19)(a − 2) is divisible by 2. Also, when a = 5, x is divisible 2 and it is not divisible by any higher power of 2. So, a_{2} may be chosen as 5. We have v_{2}(P, 2) = 2.

- To choose a_{3}:

- It can be seen that for each element a in P, the product x = (a − a_{0})(a − a_{1})(a − a_{2}) = (a − 19)(a − 2)(a − 5) is divisible by 2^{3} = 8. Also, when a = 17, x is divisible by 8 and it is not divisible by any higher power of 2. Choose a_{3} = 17. Also we have v_{3}(P,2) = 8.

- To choose a_{4}:

- It can be seen that for each element a in P, the product x = (a − a_{0})(a − a_{1})(a − a_{2})(a − a_{3}) = (a − 19)(a − 2)(a − 5)(a − 17) is divisible by 2^{4} = 16. Also, when a = 23, x is divisible 16 and it is not divisible by any higher power of 2. Choose a_{4} = 23. Also we have v_{4}(P,2) = 16.

- To choose a_{5}:

- It can be seen that for each element a in P, the product x = (a − a_{0})(a − a_{1})(a − a_{2})(a − a_{3})(a − a_{4}) = (a − 19)(a − 2)(a − 5)(a − 17)(a − 23) is divisible by 2^{7} = 128. Also, when a = 31, x is divisible 128 and it is not divisible by any higher power of 2. Choose a_{5} = 31. Also we have v_{5}(P,2) = 128.

- The process is continued. Thus a 2-ordering of P is {19, 2, 5, 17, 23, 31, ... } and the associated 2-sequence is {1, 1, 2, 8, 16, 128, ... }, assuming that v_{0}(P, 2) = 1.

- For p = 3, one possible p-ordering of P is the sequence {2, 3, 7, 5, 13, 17, 19, ... } and the associated p-sequence of P is {1, 1, 1, 3, 3, 9, ... }.

- For p = 5, one possible p-ordering of P is the sequence {2, 3, 5, 19, 11, 7, 13, ... } and the associated p-sequence is {1, 1, 1, 1, 1, 5, ...}.

- It can be shown that for p ≥ 7, the first few elements of the associated p-sequences are {1, 1, 1, 1, 1, 1, ... }.

The first few factorials associated with the set of prime numbers are obtained as follows (sequence A053657 in the OEIS).

Table of values of v_{k}(P, p) and k!_{P}

p k	2	3	5	7	11	...	k!_{P}	
0	1	1	1	1	1	...	1×1×1×1×1×... =	1
1	1	1	1	1	1	...	1×1×1×1×1×... =	1
2	2	1	1	1	1	...	2×1×1×1×1×... =	2
3	8	3	1	1	1	...	8×3×1×1×1×... =	24
4	16	3	1	1	1	...	16×3×1×1×1×... =	48
5	128	9	5	1	1	...	128×9×5×1×1×... =	5760
6	256	9	5	1	1	...	256×9×5×1×1×... =	11520

== Example: Factorials using the set of natural numbers ==
Let S be the set of integers $\mathbb{Z}$.

- For p = 2, the associated p-sequence is {1, 1, 2, 2, 8, 8, 16, 16, 128, 128, 256, 256, ... }.
- For p = 3, the associated p-sequence is {1, 1, 1, 3, 3, 3, 9, 9, 9, 27, 27, 27, 81, 81, 81, ... }.
- For p = 5, the associated p-sequence is {1, 1, 1, 1, 1, 5, 5, 5, 5, 5, 25, 25, 25, 25, 25, ... }.
- For p = 7, the associated p-sequence is {1, 1, 1, 1, 1, 1, 1, 7, 7, 7, 7, 7, 7, 7, ... }.
- ... and so on.

Thus the first few factorials using the integers are

- 0!_{$\mathbb{Z}$} = 1×1×1×1×1×... = 1.
- 1!_{$\mathbb{Z}$} = 1×1×1×1×1×... = 1.
- 2!_{$\mathbb{Z}$} = 2×1×1×1×1×... = 2.
- 3!_{$\mathbb{Z}$} = 2×3×1×1×1×... = 6.
- 4!_{$\mathbb{Z}$} = 8×3×1×1×1×... = 24.
- 5!_{$\mathbb{Z}$} = 8×3×5×1×1×... = 120.
- 6!_{$\mathbb{Z}$} = 16×9×5×1×1×... = 720.

== Examples: Some general expressions ==
The following table contains the general expressions for k!_{S} for some special cases of S.

Sl. No.	Set S	k!_{S}
1	Set of integers	k!
2	Set of even integers	2^{k}×k!
3	Set of integers of the form an + b	a^{k}×k!
4	Set of integers of the form 2^{n}	(2^{k} − 1)(2^{k} − 2) ... (2^{k} − 2^{k − 1})
5	Set of integers of the form q^{n} for some prime q	(q^{k} − 1)(q^{k} − q) ... (q^{k} − q^{k − 1})
6	Set of squares of integers	(2k)!/2
