= Wei Ho =

American mathematician

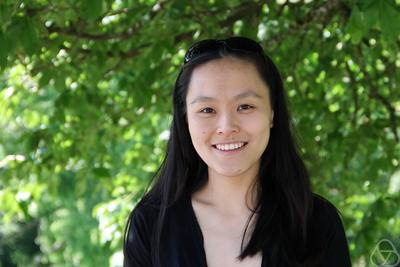
- Wei Ho at the Mathematical Research Institute at Oberwolfach, 2015
- Citizenship: United States
- Education: Harvard University; Princeton University
- Known for: Number theory
- Awards: Sloan Research Fellowship
- Scientific career
- Fields: Mathematics
- Workplaces: University of Michigan; Columbia University
- Thesis: Orbit parametrizations of curves (2009)
- Doctoral advisor: Manjul Bhargava
- Website: www-personal.umich.edu/~weiho

Wei Ho is an American mathematician specializing in number theory, algebraic geometry, arithmetic geometry, and representation theory. She is an associate professor of mathematics at the University of Michigan in Ann Arbor, Michigan.

== Education and career ==
Wei Ho grew up in Wisconsin where she attended New Berlin West High School in New Berlin, Wisconsin. She was raised with a Chinese upbringing. During her middle and high school years, she participated in the Wisconsin Math League, the MATHCOUNTS competition, and the American Invitational Mathematics Examination (AIME), the USA Mathematical Talent Search (USAMTS). After her freshman year at New Berlin, Ho attended the Young Scholar Summer Program (YSSP) at the Rose-Hulman Institute of Technology in Terre Haute, Indiana. Her performance on the US National Chemistry Olympiad qualified her for a two-week study camp at the US Air Force Academy in Air Force, Colorado. Ho played on the varsity tennis team and played violin in various orchestras while at New Berlin.

In 2003, Ho received both Master's and bachelor's degrees from Harvard University in Cambridge, Massachusetts. While at Harvard, she completed a senior honors thesis entitled The Main Conjecture of Iwasawa Theory under the supervision of Noam Elkies. After college, Ho won a Harvard Herchel Smith Fellowship in Science, which enabled her to spend a year abroad at the University of Cambridge in Cambridge, England, where she completed Part III of the Mathematical Tripos with distinction. In 2009, she completed her PhD in mathematics at Princeton University in Princeton, New Jersey, under the supervision of Manjul Bhargava. She was awarded a National Science Foundation (NSF) Postdoctoral Fellowship, which enabled her to conduct research at Harvard and Princeton.

In 2010, Ho became a Joseph Fels Ritt Assistant Professor at Columbia University in New York. Ho joined the faculty at the University of Michigan as an assistant professor in 2014 and was promoted to associate professor in 2019.

== Recognition ==
In 1994, at the age of 10, Ho got an 800 on the math portion of the SAT subject test, becoming perhaps the youngest girl to achieve that feat at the time. In 1999, Ho won a Gold Medal while representing the US at the International Chemistry Olympiad. In 2003, the Association for Women in Mathematics selected Ho as a runner-up for the Alice T. Schafer Prize for Excellence in Mathematics by an Undergraduate Woman. In that same year, Ho received the Herman Peries Prize for excellent performance in the Mathematical Tripos at Emmanuel College, University of Cambridge. In 2017, Ho was awarded a Sloan Research Fellowship by the Alfred P. Sloan Foundation.

In 2022 Ho became the director of the Women and Mathematics program at the Institute for Advanced Study, Princeton. She was named to the 2023 class of Fellows of the American Mathematical Society, "for contributions to number theory and algebraic geometry, and for service to the mathematical community".
