= Spinor genus =

In mathematics, the spinor genus is a classification of quadratic forms and lattices over the ring of integers, introduced by Martin Eichler. It refines the genus but may be coarser than proper equivalence.

== Definitions ==
We define two Z-lattices L and M in a quadratic space V over Q to be spinor equivalent if there exists a transformation g in the proper orthogonal group O^{+}(V) and for every prime p there exists a local transformation f_{p} of V_{p} of spinor norm 1 such that M = g f_{p}L_{p}.

A spinor genus is an equivalence class for this equivalence relation. Properly equivalent lattices are in the same spinor genus, and lattices in the same spinor genus are in the same genus. The number of spinor genera in a genus is a power of two, and can be determined effectively.

== Results ==
An important result is that for indefinite forms of dimension at least three, each spinor genus contains exactly one proper equivalence class.

== See also ==
- Genus of a quadratic form
