= Daniel Shanks =

American mathematician

- Born: January 17, 1917; Chicago, Illinois
- Died: September 6, 1996 (aged 79); Maryland
- Education: University of Chicago; University of Maryland, College Park
- Known for: Computing π; Integer factorization; Baby-step giant-step; Tonelli–Shanks algorithm
- Scientific career
- Fields: Mathematics

Daniel Charles Shanks (January 17, 1917 – September 6, 1996) was an American mathematician who worked primarily in numerical analysis and number theory. He was the first person to compute π to 100,000 decimal places.

== Life and education ==
Shanks was born on January 17, 1917, in Chicago, Illinois. He is not related to the English mathematician William Shanks, who was also known for his computation of π. He earned his Bachelor of Science degree in physics from the University of Chicago in 1937, and a Ph.D. in Mathematics from the University of Maryland in 1954. Prior to obtaining his PhD, Shanks worked at the Aberdeen Proving Ground and the Naval Ordnance Laboratory, first as a physicist and then as a mathematician. During this period he wrote his PhD thesis, which he completed in 1949, despite having never taken any graduate math courses.

After earning his PhD in mathematics, Shanks continued working at the Naval Ordnance Laboratory and the Naval Ship Research and Development Center at David Taylor Model Basin, where he stayed until 1976. He spent one year at the National Bureau of Standards before moving to the University of Maryland as an adjunct professor. He remained in Maryland for the rest of his life. Shanks died on September 6, 1996.

== Works ==
Shanks worked primarily in numerical analysis and number theory; however, he had many interests and also worked on black body radiation, ballistics, mathematical identities, and Epstein zeta functions.

=== Numerical analysis ===
Shanks's most prominent work in numerical analysis was a collaboration with John Wrench and others to compute the number π to 100,000 decimal digits on a computer. This was done in 1961 on an IBM 7090, and it was a major advancement over previous work.

Shanks was an editor of the Mathematics of Computation from 1959 until his death. He was noted for his very thorough reviews of papers, and for doing whatever was necessary to get the journal out.

=== Number theory ===
Shanks wrote the book Solved and Unsolved Problems in Number Theory, which mostly depended on quadratic residues and Pell's equation. The third edition of the book contains a long essay on judging conjectures, in which Shanks contended that unless there is a lot of evidence to suggest that something is true, it should not be classified as a conjecture, but rather as an open question. His essay provided many examples of bad thinking that were derived from premature conjecturing. Writing about the possible non-existence of odd perfect numbers, which had been checked to 10^{50}, he famously remarked that "10^{50} is a long way from infinity."

Most of Shanks's number theory work was in computational number theory. He developed a number of fast computer factorization methods based on quadratic forms and the class number. His algorithms include: Baby-step giant-step algorithm for computing the discrete logarithm, which is useful in public-key cryptography; Shanks's square forms factorization, integer factorization method that generalizes Fermat's factorization method; and the Tonelli–Shanks algorithm that finds square roots modulo a prime, which is useful for the quadratic sieve method of integer factorization.

In 1974, Shanks and John Wrench did some of the first computer work on estimating the value of Brun's constant, the sum of the reciprocals of the twin primes, calculating it over the twin primes among the first two million primes.

== See also ==
- Infrastructure (number theory)
- Newman–Shanks–Williams prime
- Shanks transformation
- Shanks's square forms factorization
