= 15 and 290 theorems =

On when an integer positive definite quadratic form represents all positive integers

In mathematics, the 15 theorem or Conway–Schneeberger Fifteen Theorem, proved by John H. Conway and W. A. Schneeberger in 1993, states that if a positive definite quadratic form arising from an integer matrix represents all positive integers up to 15, then it represents all positive integers. Conway and Schneeberger chose not to publish their proof because Manjul Bhargava found a simpler proof, published in 2000.

Conway conjectured an analogous statement for integral quadratic forms, with the constant 15 replaced by 290. Bhargava and Jonathan Hanke have a 2011 preprint with a proof of this "290 conjecture", but as of 2026 it has not been published, and the code containing the computations needed for the proof is no longer available at the URL listed in their preprint.

== Details ==
Suppose $Q_{ij}$ is a symmetric matrix with real entries. For any vector $x$ with integer components, define

$$Q(x) = x^t Q x = \sum_{i,j} x_i Q_{ij} x_j$$

This function is called a quadratic form. We say $Q$ is positive definite if $Q(x) > 0$ whenever $x \ne 0$. If $Q(x)$ is always an integer, we call the function $Q$ an integral quadratic form.

We get an integral quadratic form whenever the matrix entries $Q_{ij}$ are integers; then $Q$ is said to have integer matrix. However, $Q$ will still be an integral quadratic form if the off-diagonal entries $Q_{ij}$ are integers divided by 2, while the diagonal entries are integers. For example, x^{2} + xy + y^{2} is integral but does not have integral matrix.

A positive integral quadratic form taking all positive integers as values is called universal. The 15 theorem says that a quadratic form with integer matrix is universal if it takes the numbers from 1 to 15 as values. A more precise version says that, if a positive definite quadratic form with integral matrix takes the values 1, 2, 3, 5, 6, 7, 10, 14, 15 (sequence A030050 in the OEIS), then it takes all positive integers as values. Moreover, for each of these 9 numbers, there is such a quadratic form taking all other positive integers except for this number as values. If follows that none of the 9 numbers can be removed from the set.

For example, the quadratic form

$$w^2 + x^2 + y^2 + z^2$$

is universal, because every positive integer can be written as a sum of 4 squares, by Lagrange's four-square theorem. By the 15 theorem, to verify this, it is sufficient to check that every positive integer up to 15 is a sum of 4 squares. (This does not give an alternative proof of Lagrange's theorem, because Lagrange's theorem is used in the proof of the 15 theorem.)

On the other hand,

$$w^2 + 2x^2 + 5y^2 + 5z^2,$$

is a positive definite quadratic form with integral matrix that takes as values all positive integers other than 15.

The 290 theorem says a positive definite integral quadratic form is universal if it takes the numbers from 1 to 290 as values. A more precise version states that, if an integer valued integral quadratic form represents all the numbers 1, 2, 3, 5, 6, 7, 10, 13, 14, 15, 17, 19, 21, 22, 23, 26, 29, 30, 31, 34, 35, 37, 42, 58, 93, 110, 145, 203, 290 (sequence A030051 in the OEIS), then it represents all positive integers, and for each of these 29 numbers, there is such a quadratic form representing all other positive integers with the exception of this one number.

Bhargava has found analogous criteria for a quadratic form with integral matrix to represent all primes (the set {2, 3, 5, 7, 11, 13, 17, 19, 23, 29, 31, 37, 41, 43, 47, 67, 73} (sequence A154363 in the OEIS)) and the 33 theorem for such a quadratic form to represent all positive odd integers (the set {1, 3, 5, 7, 11, 15, 33} (sequence A116582 in the OEIS)).

Expository accounts of these results have been written by Hahn and Moon (who provides proofs).
