= Binary quadratic form =

Quadratic homogeneous polynomial in two variables

In mathematics, an integral binary quadratic form, also called simply a binary quadratic form, is a quadratic homogeneous polynomial in two variables x and y:

$$q(x,y)=ax^2+bxy+cy^2, \,$$

where a, b, c are integer valued coefficients. More general binary quadratic forms can be defined.

Historically, the integral form was driving force behind the development of algebraic number theory. Since the late nineteenth century, binary quadratic forms have given up their preeminence in algebraic number theory to quadratic fields and more general number fields, but advances specific to binary quadratic forms still occur on occasion.

Pierre Fermat stated that if p is an odd prime then the equation $p = x^2 + y^2$ has a solution iff $p \equiv 1 \pmod{4}$, and he made similar statements about the equations $p = x^2 + 2y^2$, $p = x^2 + 3y^2$, $p = x^2 - 2y^2$ and $p = x^2 - 3y^2$. In addition, $x^2 + y^2, x^2 + 2y^2, x^2 - 3y^2$ and so on are quadratic forms, and the theory of quadratic forms gives a unified way of looking at and proving these theorems.

Another instance of quadratic forms is Pell's equation $x^2-ny^2=1$.

Binary quadratic forms are closely related to ideals in quadratic fields. This allows the class number of a quadratic field to be calculated by counting the number of reduced binary quadratic forms of a given discriminant.

The classical theta function of 2 variables is $\sum_{(m,n)\in \mathbb{Z}^2} q^{m^2 + n^2}$, if $f(x,y)$ is a positive definite quadratic form then $\sum_{(m,n)\in \mathbb{Z}^2} q^{f(m,n)}$ is a theta function.

== Equivalence ==
Two forms f and g are called equivalent if there exist integers $\alpha, \beta, \gamma, \text{ and } \delta$ such that the following conditions hold:

$$\begin{align} f(\alpha x + \beta y, \gamma x + \delta y) &= g(x,y),\\
\alpha \delta - \beta \gamma &= 1.\end{align}$$

For example, with $f= x^2 + 4xy + 2y^2$ and $\alpha = -3$, $\beta = 2$, $\gamma = 1$, and $\delta = -1$, we find that f is equivalent to $g = (-3x+2y)^2 + 4(-3x+2y)(x-y)+2(x-y)^2$, which simplifies to $-x^2+4xy-2y^2$.

The above equivalence conditions define an equivalence relation on the set of integral quadratic forms. It follows that the quadratic forms are partitioned into equivalence classes, called classes of quadratic forms. A class invariant can mean either a function defined on equivalence classes of forms or a property shared by all forms in the same class.

Lagrange used a different notion of equivalence, in which the second condition is replaced by $\alpha \delta - \beta \gamma = \pm 1$. Since Gauss it has been recognized that this definition is inferior to that given above. If there is a need to distinguish, sometimes forms are called properly equivalent using the definition above and improperly equivalent if they are equivalent in Lagrange's sense.

In matrix terminology, which is used occasionally below, when

$$\begin{pmatrix} \alpha & \beta \\ \gamma & \delta \end{pmatrix}$$

has integer entries and determinant 1, the map $f(x,y) \mapsto f(\alpha x + \beta y, \gamma x + \delta y)$ is a (right) group action of $\mathrm{SL}_2(\mathbb{Z})$ on the set of binary quadratic forms. The equivalence relation above then arises from the general theory of group actions.

If $f=ax^2+bxy+cy^2$, then important invariants include

- The discriminant $\Delta=b^2-4ac$.
- The content, equal to the greatest common divisor of a, b, and c.

Terminology has arisen for classifying classes and their forms in terms of their invariants. A form of discriminant $\Delta$ is definite if $\Delta < 0$, degenerate if $\Delta$ is a perfect square, and indefinite otherwise. A form is primitive if its content is 1, that is, if its coefficients are coprime. If a form's discriminant is a fundamental discriminant, then the form is primitive. Discriminants satisfy $\Delta\equiv 0,1 \pmod 4.$

=== Automorphisms ===
If f is a quadratic form, a matrix

$$\begin{pmatrix} \alpha & \beta \\ \gamma & \delta \end{pmatrix}$$

in $\mathrm{SL}_2(\mathbb{Z})$ is an automorphism of f if $f(\alpha x + \beta y, \gamma x + \delta y) = f(x,y)$. For example, the matrix

$$\begin{pmatrix} 3 & -4 \\ -2 & 3 \end{pmatrix}$$

is an automorphism of the form $f = x^2 - 2y^2$. The automorphisms of a form are a subgroup of $\mathrm{SL}_2(\mathbb{Z})$. When f is definite, the group is finite, and when f is indefinite, it is infinite and cyclic.

== Representation ==
A binary quadratic form $q(x,y)$ represents an integer $n$ if it is possible to find integers $x$ and $y$ satisfying the equation $n = q(x,y).$ Such an equation is a representation of n by q.

=== Examples ===
Diophantus considered whether, for an odd integer $n$, it is possible to find integers $x$ and $y$ for which $n = x^2 + y^2$. When $n=65$, we have

$$\begin{align} 65 &= 1^2 + 8^2,\\
65 &= 4^2 + 7^2,
\end{align}$$

so we find pairs $(x,y) = (1,8) \text{ and } (4,7)$ that do the trick. We obtain more pairs that work by switching the values of $x$ and $y$ and/or by changing the sign of one or both of $x$ and $y$. In all, there are sixteen different solution pairs. On the other hand, when $n=3$, the equation

$$3=x^2 + y^2$$

does not have integer solutions. To see why, we note that $x^2 \geq 4$ unless $x = -1, 0$ or $1$. Thus, $x^2+y^2$ will exceed 3 unless $(x,y)$ is one of the nine pairs with $x$ and $y$ each equal to $-1, 0$ or $1$. We can check these nine pairs directly to see that none of them satisfies $3 = x^2 + y^2$, so the equation does not have integer solutions.

A similar argument shows that for each $n$, the equation $n =x^2+y^2$ can have only a finite number of solutions since $x^2+y^2$ will exceed $n$ unless the absolute values $|x|$ and $|y|$ are both less than $\sqrt{n}$. There are only a finite number of pairs satisfying this constraint.

Another ancient problem involving quadratic forms asks us to solve Pell's equation. For instance, we may seek integers x and y so that $1 = x^2 - 2y^2$. Changing signs of x and y in a solution gives another solution, so it is enough to seek just solutions in positive integers. One solution is $(x,y) = (3,2)$, that is, there is an equality $1 = 3^2 - 2 \cdot 2^2$. If $(x,y)$ is any solution to $1 = x^2 - 2 y^2$, then $(3x+4y,2x+3y)$ is another such pair. For instance, from the pair $(3,2)$, we compute

$$(3\cdot 3 + 4 \cdot 2, 2\cdot 3 + 3 \cdot 2) = (17,12)$$,

and we can check that this satisfies $1 = 17^2 - 2 \cdot 12^2$. Iterating this process, we find further pairs $(x,y)$ with $1 = x^2 - 2y^2$:

$$\begin{align}
(3 \cdot 17 + 4 \cdot 12, 2 \cdot 17 + 3 \cdot 12) &= (99,70),\\
(3 \cdot 99 + 4 \cdot 70, 2 \cdot 99 + 3 \cdot 70) &= (577,408),\\
&\vdots \end{align}$$

These values will keep growing in size, so we see there are infinitely many ways to represent 1 by the form $x^2 - 2y^2$. This recursive description was discussed in Theon of Smyrna's commentary on Euclid's Elements.

=== The representation problem ===
The oldest problem in the theory of binary quadratic forms is the representation problem: describe the representations of a given number $n$ by a given quadratic form f. "Describe" can mean various things: give an algorithm to generate all representations, a closed formula for the number of representations, or even just determine whether any representations exist.

The examples above discuss the representation problem for the numbers 3 and 65 by the form $x^2 + y^2$ and for the number 1 by the form $x^2 - 2y^2$. We see that 65 is represented by $x^2 + y^2$ in sixteen different ways, while 1 is represented by $x^2 - 2y^2$ in infinitely many ways and 3 is not represented by $x^2+y^2$ at all. In the first case, the sixteen representations were explicitly described. It was also shown that the number of representations of an integer by $x^2+y^2$ is always finite. The sum of squares function $r_2(n)$ gives the number of representations of n by $x^2+y^2$ as a function of n. There is a closed formula

$$r_2(n) = 4(d_1(n) - d_3(n)),$$

where $d_1(n)$ is the number of divisors of n that are congruent to 1 modulo 4 and $d_3(n)$ is the number of divisors of n that are congruent to 3 modulo 4.

There are several class invariants relevant to the representation problem:

- The set of integers represented by a class. If an integer n is represented by a form in a class, then it is represented by all other forms in a class.
- The minimum absolute value represented by a class. This is the smallest nonnegative value in the set of integers represented by a class.
- The congruence classes modulo the discriminant of a class represented by the class.

The minimum absolute value represented by a class is zero for degenerate classes and positive for definite and indefinite classes. All numbers represented by a definite form $f = ax^2 + bxy + cy^2$ have the same sign: positive if $a>0$ and negative if $a<0$. For this reason, the former are called positive definite forms and the latter are negative definite.

The number of representations of an integer n by a form f is finite if f is definite and infinite if f is indefinite. We saw instances of this in the examples above: $x^2+y^2$ is positive definite and $x^2 - 2y^2$ is indefinite.

=== Equivalent representations ===
The notion of equivalence of forms can be extended to equivalent representations. Representations $m = f(x_1,y_1)$ and $n = g(x_2,y_2)$ are equivalent if there exists a matrix

$$\begin{pmatrix} \alpha & \beta \\ \gamma & \delta \end{pmatrix}$$

with integer entries and determinant 1 so that $f(\alpha x + \beta y, \gamma x + \delta y) = g(x,y)$ and

$$\begin{pmatrix} \delta& -\beta \\ -\gamma & \alpha\end{pmatrix} \begin{pmatrix} x_1 \\ y_1 \end{pmatrix} = \begin{pmatrix} x_2 \\ y_2 \end{pmatrix}$$

The above conditions give a (right) action of the group $\mathrm{SL}_2(\mathbb{Z})$ on the set of representations of integers by binary quadratic forms. It follows that equivalence defined this way is an equivalence relation and in particular that the forms in equivalent representations are equivalent forms.

As an example, let $f = x^2 - 2y^2$ and consider a representation $1 = f(x_1,y_1)$. Such a representation is a solution to the Pell equation described in the examples above. The matrix

$$\begin{pmatrix} 3 & -4 \\ -2 & 3 \end{pmatrix}$$

has determinant 1 and is an automorphism of f. Acting on the representation $1 = f(x_1,y_1)$ by this matrix yields the equivalent representation $1 = f(3x_1 + 4y_1, 2x_1 + 3 y_1)$. This is the recursion step in the process described above for generating infinitely many solutions to $1 = x^2 - 2y^2$. Iterating this matrix action, we find that the infinite set of representations of 1 by f that were determined above are all equivalent.

There are generally finitely many equivalence classes of representations of an integer n by forms of given nonzero discriminant $\Delta$. A complete set of representatives for these classes can be given in terms of reduced forms defined in the section below. When $\Delta < 0$, every representation is equivalent to a unique representation by a reduced form, so a complete set of representatives is given by the finitely many representations of n by reduced forms of discriminant $\Delta$. When $\Delta > 0$, Zagier proved that every representation of a positive integer n by a form of discriminant $\Delta$ is equivalent to a unique representation $n = f(x,y)$ in which f is reduced in Zagier's sense and $x > 0$, $y \geq 0$. The set of all such representations constitutes a complete set of representatives for equivalence classes of representations.

== Reduction and class numbers ==
Joseph-Louis Lagrange proved that for every value D, there are only finitely many classes of binary quadratic forms with discriminant D. Their number is the class number of discriminant D. He described an algorithm, called reduction, for constructing a canonical representative in each class, the reduced form, whose coefficients are the smallest in a suitable sense.

Gauss gave a superior reduction algorithm in Disquisitiones Arithmeticae, which ever since has been the reduction algorithm most commonly given in textbooks. In 1981, Don Zagier published an alternative reduction algorithm which has found several uses as an alternative to Gauss's.

== Composition ==
Composition most commonly refers to a binary operation on primitive equivalence classes of forms of the same discriminant, one of the deepest discoveries of Gauss, which makes this set into a finite abelian group called the form class group (or simply class group) of discriminant $\Delta$. Class groups have since become one of the central ideas in algebraic number theory. From a modern perspective, the class group of a fundamental discriminant $\Delta$ is isomorphic to the narrow class group of the quadratic field $\mathbf{Q}(\sqrt{\Delta})$ of discriminant $\Delta$. For negative $\Delta$, the narrow class group is the same as the ideal class group, but for positive $\Delta$ it may be twice as big.

"Composition" also sometimes refers to, roughly, a binary operation on binary quadratic forms. The word "roughly" indicates two caveats: only certain pairs of binary quadratic forms can be composed, and the resulting form is not well-defined (although its equivalence class is). The composition operation on equivalence classes is defined by first defining composition of forms and then showing that this induces a well-defined operation on classes.

"Composition" can also refer to a binary operation on representations of integers by forms. This operation is substantially more complicated than composition of forms, but arose first historically. We will consider such operations in a separate section below.

Composition means taking 2 quadratic forms of the same discriminant and combining them to create a quadratic form of the same discriminant, as follows from Brahmagupta's identity.

=== Composing forms and classes ===
A variety of definitions of composition of forms has been given, often in an attempt to simplify the extremely technical and general definition of Gauss. We present here Arndt's method, because it remains rather general while being simple enough to be amenable to computations by hand. An alternative definition is described at Bhargava cubes.

Suppose we wish to compose forms $f_1 = A_1 x^2 + B_1 xy + C_1 y^2$ and $f_2 = A_2 x^2 + B_2 xy + C_2 y^2$, each primitive and of the same discriminant $\Delta$. We perform the following steps:

1. Compute $B_\mu = \tfrac{B_1 + B_2}{2}$ and $e = \gcd(A_1, A_2, B_\mu)$, and $A = \tfrac{A_1 A_2}{e^2}$
2. Solve the system of congruences
  $$\begin{align} x &\equiv B_1 \pmod{2 \tfrac{A_1}{e}}\\ x &\equiv B_2 \pmod{2 \tfrac{A_2}{e}}\\ \tfrac{B_\mu}{e} x &\equiv \tfrac{\Delta + B_1 B_2}{2e} \pmod{2A} \end{align}$$
  It can be shown that this system always has a unique integer solution modulo $2A$. We arbitrarily choose such a solution and call it B.
3. Compute C such that $\Delta = B^2 - 4AC$. It can be shown that C is an integer.

The form $Ax^2 + Bxy + Cy^2$ is "the" composition of $f_1$ and $f_2$. We see that its first coefficient is well-defined, but the other two depend on the choice of B and C. One way to make this a well-defined operation is to make an arbitrary convention for how to choose B—for instance, choose B to be the smallest positive solution to the system of congruences above. Alternatively, we may view the result of composition, not as a form, but as an equivalence class of forms modulo the action of the group of matrices of the form

$$\begin{pmatrix} 1 & n\\ 0 & 1\end{pmatrix}$$,

where n is an integer. If we consider the class of $Ax^2 + Bxy + Cy^2$ under this action, the middle coefficients of the forms in the class form a congruence class of integers modulo 2A. Thus, composition gives a well-defined function from pairs of binary quadratic forms to such classes.

It can be shown that if $f_1$ and $f_2$ are equivalent to $g_1$ and $g_2$ respectively, then the composition of $f_1$ and $f_2$ is equivalent to the composition of $g_1$ and $g_2$. It follows that composition induces a well-defined operation on primitive classes of discriminant $\Delta$, and as mentioned above, Gauss showed these classes form a finite abelian group. The identity class in the group is the unique class containing all forms $x^2 + Bxy + Cy^2$, i.e., with first coefficient 1. (It can be shown that all such forms lie in a single class, and the restriction $\Delta \equiv 0 \text{ or } 1 \pmod{4}$ implies that there exists such a form of every discriminant.) To invert a class, we take a representative $Ax^2 + Bxy + Cy^2$ and form the class of $Ax^2 - Bxy + Cy^2$. Alternatively, we can form the class of $Cx^2 + Bxy + Ay^2$ since this and $Ax^2 - Bxy + Cy^2$ are equivalent.

== Genera of binary quadratic forms ==
Gauss also considered a coarser notion of equivalence, with each coarse class called a genus of forms. Each genus is the union of a finite number of equivalence classes of the same discriminant, with the number of classes depending only on the discriminant. In the context of binary quadratic forms, genera can be defined either through congruence classes of numbers represented by forms or by genus characters defined on the set of forms. A third definition is a special case of the genus of a quadratic form in n variables. This states that forms are in the same genus if they are locally equivalent at all rational primes (including the Archimedean place).

== History ==
There is circumstantial evidence of protohistoric knowledge of algebraic identities involving binary quadratic forms. The first problem concerning binary quadratic forms asks for the existence or construction of representations of integers by particular binary quadratic forms. The prime examples are the solution of Pell's equation and the representation of integers as sums of two squares. Pell's equation was already considered by the Indian mathematician Brahmagupta in the 7th century CE. Several centuries later, his ideas were extended to a complete solution of Pell's equation known as the chakravala method, attributed to either of the Indian mathematicians Jayadeva or Bhāskara II. The problem of representing integers by sums of two squares was considered in the 3rd century by Diophantus. In the 17th century, inspired while reading Diophantus's Arithmetica, Fermat made several observations about representations by specific quadratic forms including that which is now known as Fermat's theorem on sums of two squares. Euler provided the first proofs of Fermat's observations and added some new conjectures about representations by specific forms, without proof.

The general theory of quadratic forms was initiated by Lagrange in 1775 in his Recherches d'Arithmétique. Lagrange was the first to realize that "a coherent general theory required the simulatenous consideration of all forms." He was the first to recognize the importance of the discriminant and to define the essential notions of equivalence and reduction, which, according to Weil, have "dominated the whole subject of quadratic forms ever since". Lagrange showed that there are finitely many equivalence classes of given discriminant, thereby defining for the first time an arithmetic class number. His introduction of reduction allowed the quick enumeration of the classes of given discriminant and foreshadowed the eventual development of infrastructure. In 1798, Legendre published Essai sur la théorie des nombres, which summarized the work of Euler and Lagrange and added some of his own contributions, including the first glimpse of a composition operation on forms.

The theory was vastly extended and refined by Gauss in Section V of Disquisitiones Arithmeticae. Gauss introduced a very general version of a composition operator that allows composing even forms of different discriminants and imprimitive forms. He replaced Lagrange's equivalence with the more precise notion of proper equivalence, and this enabled him to show that the primitive classes of given discriminant form a group under the composition operation. He introduced genus theory, which gives a powerful way to understand the quotient of the class group by the subgroup of squares. (Gauss and many subsequent authors wrote 2b in place of b; the modern convention allowing the coefficient of xy to be odd is due to Eisenstein).

These investigations of Gauss strongly influenced both the arithmetical theory of quadratic forms in more than two variables and the subsequent development of algebraic number theory, where quadratic fields are replaced with more general number fields. But the impact was not immediate. Section V of Disquisitiones contains truly revolutionary ideas and involves very complicated computations, sometimes left to the reader. Combined, the novelty and complexity made Section V notoriously difficult. Dirichlet published simplifications of the theory that made it accessible to a broader audience. The culmination of this work is his text Vorlesungen über Zahlentheorie. The third edition of this work includes two supplements by Dedekind. Supplement XI introduces ring theory, and from then on, especially after the 1897 publication of Hilbert's Zahlbericht, the theory of binary quadratic forms lost its preeminent position in algebraic number theory and became overshadowed by the more general theory of algebraic number fields.

Even so, work on binary quadratic forms with integer coefficients continues to the present. This includes numerous results about quadratic number fields, which can often be translated into the language of binary quadratic forms, but also includes developments about forms themselves or that originated by thinking about forms, including Shanks's infrastructure, Zagier's reduction algorithm, Conway's topographs, and Bhargava's reinterpretation of composition through Bhargava cubes.

== See also ==
- Bhargava cube
- Fermat's theorem on sums of two squares
- Legendre symbol
- Brahmagupta's identity
