= Genus of a quadratic form =

Mathematical concept

In mathematics, the genus is a classification of quadratic forms and lattices over the ring of integers. An integral quadratic form is a quadratic form on Z^{n}, or equivalently a free Z-module of finite rank. Two such forms are in the same genus if they are equivalent over the local rings Z_{p} for each prime p and also equivalent over R.

Equivalent forms are in the same genus, but the converse does not hold. For example, x^{2} + 82y^{2} and 2x^{2} + 41y^{2} are in the same genus but not equivalent over Z. Forms in the same genus have equal discriminant and hence there are only finitely many equivalence classes in a genus.

The Smith–Minkowski–Siegel mass formula gives the weight or mass of the quadratic forms in a genus, the count of equivalence classes weighted by the reciprocals of the orders of their automorphism groups.

== Binary quadratic forms ==
For binary quadratic forms there is a group structure on the set C of equivalence classes of forms with given discriminant. The genera are defined by the generic characters. The principal genus, the genus containing the principal form, is precisely the subgroup C^{2} and the genera are the cosets of C^{2}: so in this case all genera contain the same number of classes of forms.

== See also ==
- Spinor genus
