= Pohlig =

Pohlig is a surname. Notable people with the surname include:

- Karl Pohlig (1864–1928), German conductor
- Stephen Pohlig (1952/53–2017), American electrical engineer
