= XDH =

XDH may refer to:

- XDH assumption (External Diffie–Hellman assumption), a mathematic assumption used in elliptic curve cryptography
- Xanthine dehydrogenase, an enzyme
