= Pseudorandom ensemble =

In cryptography, a pseudorandom ensemble is a family of variables meeting the following criteria:

Let $U = \{U_n\}_{n \in \mathbb{N}}$ be a uniform ensemble and $X = \{X_n\}_{n \in \mathbb{N}}$ be an ensemble. The ensemble $X$ is called pseudorandom if $X$ and $U$ are indistinguishable in polynomial time.
