= Sub-group hiding =

The sub-group hiding assumption is a computational hardness assumption used in elliptic curve cryptography and pairing-based cryptography.

It was first introduced to build a 2-DNF homomorphic encryption scheme.

== See also ==
- Non-interactive zero-knowledge proof
