= Quasi-commutative property =

In mathematics, the quasi-commutative property is an extension or generalization of the general commutative property. This property is used in specific applications with various definitions.

== Applied to matrices ==
Two matrices $p$ and $q$ are said to have the commutative property whenever $pq = qp$

The quasi-commutative property in matrices is defined as follows. Given two non-commutable matrices $x$ and $y$ $xy - yx = z$

satisfy the quasi-commutative property whenever $z$ satisfies the following properties:
$$\begin{align}
xz &= zx \\
yz &= zy
\end{align}$$

An example is found in the matrix mechanics introduced by Heisenberg as a version of quantum mechanics. In this mechanics, p and q are infinite matrices corresponding respectively to the momentum and position variables of a particle. These matrices are written out at Matrix mechanics#Harmonic oscillator, and z = iħ times the infinite unit matrix, where ħ is the reduced Planck constant.

== Applied to functions ==
A function $f : X \times Y \to X$ is said to be quasi-commutative if $f\left(f\left(x, y_1\right), y_2\right) = f\left(f\left(x, y_2\right), y_1\right) \qquad \text{ for all } x \in X, \; y_1, y_2 \in Y.$

If $f(x, y)$ is instead denoted by $x \ast y$ then this can be rewritten as: $(x \ast y) \ast y_2 = \left(x \ast y_2\right) \ast y \qquad \text{ for all } x \in X, \; y, y_2 \in Y.$

== See also ==
- Commutative property – Property of some mathematical operations
- Accumulator (cryptography)
