= Stephen Pohlig =

American electrical engineer (1952/1953–2017)

Stephen C. Pohlig (1952/1953 in Washington, D.C. – April 14, 2017) was an American electrical engineer who worked in the MIT Lincoln Laboratory. As a graduate student of Martin Hellman's at Stanford University in the mid-1970s, he helped develop the underlying concepts of Diffie-Hellman key exchange, including the Pohlig–Hellman exponentiation cipher and the Pohlig–Hellman algorithm for computing discrete logarithms. That cipher can be regarded as a predecessor to the RSA (cryptosystem) since all that is needed to transform it into RSA is to change the arithmetic from modulo a prime number to modulo a composite number.

In his spare time Stephen Pohlig was a keen kayaker known to many throughout the New England area.

Pohlig died on April 14, 2017, at the age of 64 after fighting gallbladder cancer for a year.

== Bibliography ==
- S. Pohlig and M. Hellman, "An improved algorithm for computing logarithms over GF(p) and its cryptographic significance (Corresp.)," Information Theory, IEEE Transactions on 24, no. 1 (1978): 106-110.
- Martin E. Hellman and Stephen C. Pohlig, "United States Patent: 4424414 - Exponentiation cryptographic apparatus and method," January 3, 1984.
