= Group signature =

Privacy-based cryptographic primitive

A group signature scheme is a method for allowing a member of a group to anonymously sign a message on behalf of the group. The concept was first introduced by David Chaum and Eugene van Heyst in 1991. For example, a group signature scheme could be used by an employee of a large company where it is sufficient for a verifier to know a message was signed by an employee, but not which particular employee signed it. Another application is for keycard access to restricted areas where it is inappropriate to track individual employee's movements, but necessary to secure areas to only employees in the group.

Essential to a group signature scheme is a group manager, who is in charge of adding group members and has the ability to reveal the original signer in the event of disputes. In some systems the responsibilities of adding members and revoking signature anonymity are separated and given to a membership manager and revocation manager respectively. Many schemes have been proposed, however all should follow these basic requirements:

Soundness and completeness
Valid signatures by group members always verify correctly, and invalid signatures always fail verification.
Unforgeable
Only members of the group can create valid group signatures.
Anonymity
Given a message and its signature, the identity of the individual signer cannot be determined without the group manager's secret key.
Traceability
Given any valid signature, the group manager should be able to trace which user issued the signature. (This and the previous requirement imply that only the group manager can break users' anonymity.)
Unlinkability
Given two messages and their signatures, we cannot tell if the signatures were from the same signer or not.
No framing
Even if all other group members (and the managers) collude, they cannot forge a signature for a non-participating group member.
Unforgeable tracing verification
The revocation manager cannot falsely accuse a signer of creating a signature he did not create.
Coalition resistance
A colluding subset of group members cannot generate a valid signature that the group manager cannot link to one of the colluding group members.

The ACJT 2000, BBS04, and BS04 (in CCS) group signature schemes are some of the state of the art. (Note: this might be an incomplete list.)

Boneh, Boyen and Shacham published in 2004 (BBS04, Crypto04) a novel group signature scheme based on bilinear maps. Signatures in this scheme are approximately the size of a standard RSA signature (around 200 bytes). The security of the scheme is proven in the random oracle model and relies on the Strong Diffie Hellman assumption (SDH) and a new assumption in bilinear groups called the Decision linear assumption (DLin).

A more formal definition that is geared towards provable security was given by Bellare, Micciancio and Warinschi.

== See also ==
- Ring signature: A similar system that excludes the requirement of a group manager and provides true anonymity for signers (several algorithms nevertheless maintain some "restricting" properties, like traceability or linkability)
- Threshold signature: A threshold signature involves a fixed-size quorum (threshold) of signers. Each signer must be a genuine group member with a share of a group secret signing key. A (t,n) threshold signature scheme supports n potential signers, any t of which can sign on behalf of the group. Threshold signatures reveal nothing about the t signers; no one can trace the identity of the signers (not even a trusted center who have set up the system).
- Multisignature: A multisignature represents a certain number of signers signing a given message. Number of signers is not fixed and signers identities are evident from a given multi-signature. A multisignature is much shorter (sometimes constant) than the simple collection of individual signatures.
