= Pairing-based cryptography =

Technique in cryptography

Pairing-based cryptography is the use of a pairing between elements of two cryptographic groups to a third group with a mapping $e :G_1 \times G_2 \to G_T$ to construct or analyze cryptographic systems.

== Definition ==
The following definition is commonly used in most academic papers.

Let $\mathbb{F}_q$ be a finite field over prime $q$, $G_1, G_2$ two additive cyclic groups of prime order $q$, and $G_T$ another cyclic group of order $q$ written multiplicatively. A pairing is a map: $e: G_1 \times G_2 \rightarrow G_T$, which satisfies the following properties:

Bilinearity
$$\forall a,b \in \mathbb{F}_q^*, P\in G_1, Q\in G_2:\ e\left(aP, bQ\right) = e\left(P, Q\right)^{ab}$$
Non-degeneracy
If $P$ generates $G_1$ and $Q$ generates $G_2$, then $e(P,Q)$ generates $G_T$ (i.e., $e(P, Q) \neq 1$).
Computability
There exists an efficient algorithm to compute $e$.

== Classification ==
If the same group is used for the first two groups (i.e. $G_1 = G_2$), the pairing is called symmetric and is a mapping from two elements of one group to an element from a second group.

Some researchers classify pairing instantiations into three (or more) basic types:

1. $G_1 = G_2$;
2. $G_1 \ne G_2$ but there is an efficiently computable homomorphism $\phi : G_2 \to G_1$;
3. $G_1 \ne G_2$ and there are no efficiently computable homomorphisms between $G_1$ and $G_2$.

== Usage in cryptography ==
If symmetric, pairings can be used to reduce a hard problem in one group to a different, usually easier problem in another group.

For example, in groups equipped with a bilinear mapping such as the Weil pairing or Tate pairing, generalizations of the computational Diffie–Hellman problem (CDH) are believed to be infeasible while the simpler decisional Diffie–Hellman problem (DDH) can be easily solved using the pairing function. The first group is sometimes referred to as a Gap Group because of the assumed difference in difficulty between these two problems in the group.

To illustrate, let $e : G \times G \to G_T$ be a symmetric, non-degenerate, efficiently computable bilinear pairing, where $G$ is a multiplicative group with generator $g$. Consider an instance of the CDH problem: given $g$, $g^x$, and $g^y$, the goal is to compute $g^{xy}$. The pairing function $e$ does not directly help us compute $g^{xy}$, leaving the CDH problem presumably intractable. However, given a candidate solution $g^z$, we can check if $g^z = g^{xy}$ (thereby solving the DDH problem) without knowing $x$, $y$, or $z$, by testing if:

$$e(g^x, g^y) = e(g, g^z)$$

By using the bilinear property, we can pull the exponents out:

$e(g^x, g^y) = e(g, g)^{xy}$ and $e(g, g^z) = e(g, g)^z$

Since $G_T$ is a prime order group, the equality $e(g, g)^{xy} = e(g, g)^z$ implies $xy \equiv z \pmod q$, validating the candidate answer.

While first used for cryptanalysis, pairings have also been used to construct many cryptographic systems for which no other efficient implementation is known, such as identity-based encryption or attribute-based encryption schemes.

Pairing-based cryptography is used in the KZG cryptographic commitment scheme and is exemplified in the BLS digital signature scheme.

== Cryptanalysis ==
In June 2012 the National Institute of Information and Communications Technology (NICT), Kyushu University, and Fujitsu Laboratories Limited improved the previous bound for successfully computing a discrete logarithm on a supersingular elliptic curve from 676 bits to 923 bits.

In 2016, the Extended Tower Number Field Sieve (exTNFS) algorithm allowed to reduce the complexity of finding discrete logarithms in some resulting groups of pairings. There are several variants of the multiple and extended tower number field sieve algorithm expanding the applicability and improving the complexity of the algorithm. A unified description of all such algorithms with further improvements was published in 2019. In view of these advances, several works provided revised concrete estimates on the key sizes of secure pairing-based cryptosystems.
