= Distribution ensemble =

In cryptography, a distribution ensemble or probability ensemble is a family of distributions or random variables $X = \{X_i\}_{i \in I}$ where $I$ is a (countable) index set, and each $X_i$ is a random variable, or probability distribution. Often $I=\N$ and it is required that each $X_n$ have a certain property for n sufficiently large.

For example, a uniform ensemble $U = \{U_n\}_{n \in \mathbb{N}}$ is a distribution ensemble where each $U_n$ is uniformly distributed over strings of length n. In fact, many applications of probability ensembles implicitly assume that the probability spaces for the random variables all coincide in this way, so every probability ensemble is also a stochastic process.

== See also ==
- Provable security
- Statistically close
- Pseudorandom ensemble
- Computational indistinguishability
