= Tate pairing =

In mathematics, Tate pairing is any of several closely related bilinear pairings involving elliptic curves or abelian varieties, usually over local or finite fields, based on the Tate duality pairings introduced by Tate (1958, 1963) and extended by Lichtenbaum (1969). Rück & Frey (1994) applied the Tate pairing over finite fields to cryptography.

== See also ==
- Weil pairing
