= Discrete logarithm =

Problem of inverting exponentiation in groups

Discrete logarithms modulo 5 to base 2. Each arrow represents multiplication by 2 modulo 5. Starting at 1, the discrete logarithm of a nonzero residue is the number of arrows needed to reach it, modulo 4.

In mathematics, for given real numbers $a$ and $b$, the logarithm $\log_b(a)$ is a number $x$ such that $b^x = a$. The discrete logarithm is an analogous concept in group theory. In any group $G$, powers $b^k$ can be defined for all integers $k$, and the discrete logarithm $\log_b(a)$ is an integer $k$ such that $b^k = a$. In the special case of arithmetic modulo an integer $m$, the more commonly used term is index: One can write $k = \operatorname{ind}_b a \!\!\!\! \pmod{m}$ when $b^k \equiv a \!\!\!\! \pmod{m}$.

Discrete logarithms are quickly computable in a few special cases, but no efficient method is known for computing them in general. Several cryptographic systems, including Diffie–Hellman and ElGamal, base their security on the hardness assumption that the discrete logarithm problem over carefully chosen groups has no efficient solution. In general, there is no subexponential time solution for black box groups.

== Definition ==
Let $G$ be any group. Denote its group operation by multiplication and its identity element by $1$. Let $b$ be any element of $G$. For any positive integer $k$, the expression $b^k$ denotes the product of $b$ with itself $k$ times:
$$b^k = \underbrace{b \cdot b \cdot \ldots \cdot b}_{k \; \text{factors}}.$$
Similarly, let $b^{-k}$ denote the product of $b^{-1}$ with itself $k$ times. For $k=0$, the $k$^{th} power is the identity: $b^0=1$.

Let $a$ also be an element of $G$. An integer $k$ that solves the equation $b^k=a$ is termed a discrete logarithm (or simply logarithm, in this context) of $a$ to the base $b$. One writes $k=\log_b a$.

== Examples ==
=== Powers of 10 ===
The powers of 10 are
$$\ldots, 0.001, 0.01, 0.1, 1, 10, 100, 1000, \ldots.$$
For any number $a$ in this list, one can compute $\log_{10}a$. For example, $\log_{10}{10000}=4$, and $\log_{10}{0.001}=-3$. These are instances of the discrete logarithm problem.

Other base-10 logarithms in the real numbers are not instances of the discrete logarithm problem, because they involve non-integer exponents. For example, the equation $\log_{10}{53}=1.724276\ldots$ means that $10^{1.724276\ldots}=53$. While integer exponents can be defined in any group using products and inverses, arbitrary real exponents, such as this 1.724276…, require other concepts such as the exponential function.

In group-theoretic terms, the powers of 10 form a cyclic group $G$ under multiplication, and 10 is a generator for this group. The discrete logarithm $\log_{10}a$ is defined for any $a$ in $G$.

=== Powers of a fixed real number ===
A similar example holds for any non-zero real number $b$. The powers form a multiplicative subgroup $G = \{\ldots , b^{-2}, b^{-1}, 1, b^{1}, b^{2}, \ldots \}$ of the non-zero real numbers. For any element $a$ of $G$, one can compute $\log_b a$.

=== Modular arithmetic ===
Let $p$ be a prime number, and let Z_{p}^{×} be the group multiplicative group of integers modulo $p$. Its elements are non-zero congruence classes modulo $p$, which can be written $1, 2, 3, \ldots, p - 1$. The group product of two elements is obtained by ordinary integer multiplication followed by reduction modulo $p$.

The $k$^{th} power of one of the numbers in this group may be computed by finding its $k$^{th} power as an integer and then finding the remainder after division by $p$. When the numbers involved are large, it is more efficient to reduce modulo $p$ multiple times during the computation. Regardless of the specific algorithm used, this operation is called modular exponentiation. For example, consider Z_{17}^{×}. To compute $3^4$ in this group, compute $3^4=81$, and then divide $81$ by $17$, obtaining a remainder of $13$. Thus $3^4=13$ in the group Z_{17}^{×}.

The discrete logarithm is just the inverse operation. For example, consider the equation
$$3^k \equiv 13 \pmod{17}.$$
From the example above, one solution is $k=4$, and therefore $\log_3 13 = 4$ in Z_{17}^{×}. However, $4$ is not the only solution. Because
$$3^{16}\equiv 1 \pmod{17},$$
it follows that if $n$ is any integer then
$$3^{4+16n}\equiv 3^4\cdot (3^{16})^n \equiv 3^4 \cdot 1^n \equiv 3^4 \equiv 13 \pmod{17}.$$
Hence the equation has infinitely many solutions of the form $4+16n$. Moreover, because $16$ is the smallest positive integer $m$ satisfying $3^m\equiv 1 \pmod{17}$, these are the only solutions. Equivalently, the set of all possible solutions can be expressed by the constraint that $k \equiv 4 \pmod{16}$.

=== Powers of the identity ===
In the special case where $b$ is the identity element $1$ of the group $G$, the discrete logarithm $\log_ba$ is undefined for $a$ other than $1$, and every integer $k$ is a discrete logarithm for $a=1$.

=== Elliptic curve ===
Let C be a Weierstrass normal form elliptic curve in the projective plane over a field F. Let O be the point at infinity on C. For any points P and Q of C, let P # Q denote the unique third point of C, where the line through P and Q intersects C. (If P = Q, then the line in question is the line tangent to C at P. If P = Q = O, then P # Q = O.) Define an "addition" operation on C by
$$P + Q = (P \; \# \; Q) \; \# \; O.$$
This addition operation makes C a commutative group with identity element O. For any point P of C, let
$$k P = P + P + \cdots + P$$
denote the sum of k copies of P. In this context, the discrete logarithm problem is: Given points P and Q, find k such that $Q = k P$. When the underlying field F is a finite field, this problem has cryptographic applications.

== Properties ==
Powers obey the usual algebraic identity $b^{k+l}=b^k\cdot b^l$. In other words, the function
$$f \colon \mathbf{Z} \to G$$
defined by $f(k)=b^k$ is a group homomorphism from the group of integers $\mathbf{Z}$ under addition onto the subgroup $H$ of $G$ generated by $b$. For all $a$ in $H$, $\log_b a$ exists. Conversely, $\log_b a$ does not exist for $a$ that are not in $H$.

If $H$ is infinite, then $\log_b a$ is also unique, and the discrete logarithm amounts to a group isomorphism
$$\log_b \colon H \to \mathbf{Z}.$$

On the other hand, if $H$ is finite of order $n$, then $\log_b a$ is unique only up to congruence modulo $n$, and the discrete logarithm amounts to a group isomorphism
$$\log_b\colon H \to \mathbf{Z}_n,$$
where $\mathbf{Z}_n$ denotes the additive group of integers modulo $n$.

The familiar base change formula for ordinary logarithms remains valid: If $c$ is another generator of $H$, then
$$\log_c a = \log_c b \cdot \log_b a.$$

== Algorithms ==
Unsolved problem in computer science
Can the discrete logarithm be computed in polynomial time on a classical computer?
More unsolved problems in computer science

The discrete logarithm problem is considered to be computationally intractable. For a classical (e.g., non-quantum) computer, no efficient (polynomial-time) algorithm is yet known for computing discrete logarithms in general.

A general algorithm for computing $\log_b a$ in finite groups $G$ is to raise $b$ to larger and larger powers $k$ until the desired $a$ is found. This algorithm is sometimes called trial multiplication. It requires running time linear in the size of the group $G$ and thus exponential in the number of digits in the size of the group. Therefore, it is an exponential-time algorithm, practical only for small groups $G$.

More sophisticated algorithms exist, usually inspired by similar algorithms for integer factorization. These algorithms run faster than the naïve algorithm, some of them proportional to the square root of the size of the group, and thus exponential in half the number of digits in the size of the group. However, none of them runs in polynomial time (in the number of digits in the size of the group).

- Baby-step giant-step
- Function field sieve
- Index calculus algorithm
- Number field sieve
- Pohlig–Hellman algorithm
- Pollard's rho algorithm for logarithms
- Pollard's kangaroo algorithm (aka Pollard's lambda algorithm)

There is an efficient quantum algorithm due to Peter Shor.

Efficient classical algorithms also exist in certain special cases. For example, in the group of the integers modulo $p$ under addition, the power $b^k$ becomes a product $b \cdot k$, and equality means congruence modulo $p$ in the integers. The extended Euclidean algorithm finds $k$ quickly.

With Diffie–Hellman, a cyclic group modulo a prime $p$ is used, allowing an efficient computation of the discrete logarithm with Pohlig–Hellman if the order of the group (being $p-1$) is sufficiently smooth, i.e. has no large prime factors.

== Comparison with integer factorization ==
While computing discrete logarithms and integer factorization are distinct problems, they share some properties:

- both are special cases of the hidden subgroup problem for finite abelian groups,
- both problems seem to be difficult (no efficient algorithms are known for non-quantum computers),
- for both problems efficient algorithms on quantum computers are known,
- algorithms from one problem are often adapted to the other, and
- the difficulty of both problems has been used to construct various cryptographic systems.

== Cryptography ==
There exist groups for which computing discrete logarithms is apparently difficult. In some cases (e.g. large prime order subgroups of groups $\mathbf{Z}_p^\times$) there is not only no efficient algorithm known for the worst case, but the average-case complexity can be shown to be about as hard as the worst case using random self-reducibility.

At the same time, the inverse problem of discrete exponentiation is not difficult (it can be computed efficiently using exponentiation by squaring, for example). This asymmetry is analogous to the one between integer factorization and integer multiplication. Both asymmetries (and other possibly one-way functions) have been exploited in the construction of cryptographic systems.

Popular choices for the group $G$ in discrete logarithm cryptography (DLC) are the cyclic groups $\mathbf{Z}_p^\times$ (e.g. ElGamal encryption, Diffie–Hellman key exchange, and the Digital Signature Algorithm) and cyclic subgroups of elliptic curves over finite fields (see Elliptic curve cryptography).

While there is no publicly known algorithm for solving the discrete logarithm problem in general, the first three steps of the number field sieve algorithm only depend on the group $G$, not on the specific elements of $G$ whose finite $\log$ is desired. By precomputing these three steps for a specific group, one need only carry out the last step, which is much less computationally expensive than the first three, to obtain a specific logarithm in that group.

It turns out that much internet traffic uses one of a handful of groups that are of order 1024 bits or less, e.g. cyclic groups with order of the Oakley primes specified in RFC 2409. The Logjam attack used this vulnerability to compromise a variety of internet services that allowed the use of groups whose order was a 512-bit prime number, so called export grade.

The authors of the Logjam attack estimate that the much more difficult precomputation needed to solve the discrete log problem for a 1024-bit prime would be within the budget of a large national intelligence agency such as the U.S. National Security Agency (NSA). The Logjam authors speculate that precomputation against widely reused 1024 DH primes is behind claims in leaked NSA documents that the NSA is able to break much of current cryptography.

== See also ==
- A. W. Faber Model 366
- Percy Ludgate and Irish logarithm
