= ITCS =

ITCS may refer to:

- Incremental Train Control System, an implementation of positive train control
- Information Technology Central Services, a Myanmar ISP
- Institute for Theoretical Computer Science, at Tsinghua University in Beijing
- Innovations in Theoretical Computer Science, an academic conference in theoretical computer science
