= Yehuda Lindell =

Israeli cryptographer (born 1971)

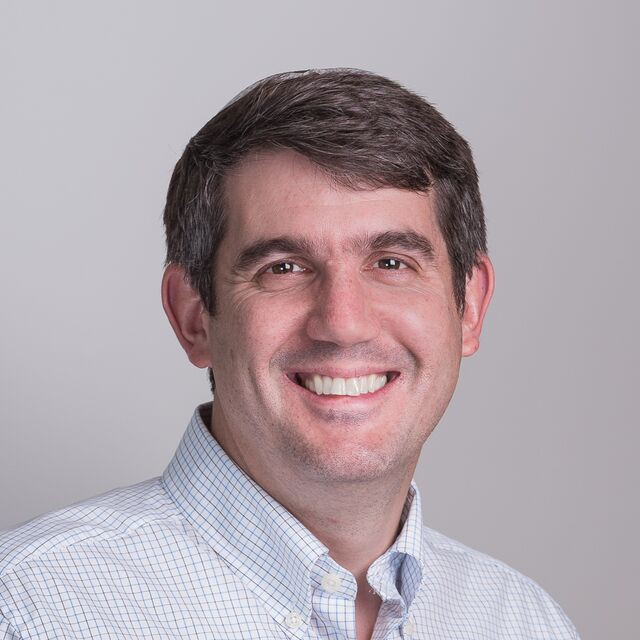
- Born: 24 February 1971 (age 55); Australia
- Education: BSc Bar-Ilan University, 1997; MSc Bar-Ilan University, 1998; Ph.D. Weizmann Institute of Science, 2002
- Known for: Secure multi-party computation
- Scientific career
- Fields: Cryptography
- Workplaces: Bar Ilan University
- Doctoral advisor: Oded Goldreich and Moni Naor

Yehuda Lindell (born 24 February 1971) is an Israeli professor in the Department of Computer Science at Bar-Ilan University where he conducts research on cryptography with a focus on the theory of secure computation and its application in practice. Lindell currently leads the cryptography team at Coinbase.

== Education and academic positions ==
Lindell received a BSc and Msc degree in computer science from Bar-Ilan University. He then obtained a PhD in computer science from the Weizmann Institute of Science in 2002. Lindell received a Raviv Fellowship and spent two years at IBM's cryptography research group at the T.J. Watson Research Center. In 2004, he returned to Israel to take up an academic position at Bar-Ilan University. Lindell's work on secure computation was recognized by the award of an ERC starting grant in 2009 and an ERC consolidators grant in 2014. Lindell was appointed as an IACR Fellow in 2021,, and received the RSA Award for Excellence in Mathematics in 2026.

== Industry experience ==
Lindell worked from 2004 to 2014 as a permanent cryptographic consultant to Safenet, formally Aladdin. He co-founded the company Unbound Security, and served as its Chief Scientist from 2014 to 2018. In early 2019, he took over the role of CEO of Unbound Security, taking leave from Bar-Ilan University. In January 2022, Unbound Security was acquired by Coinbase, and Lindell now leads their cryptography team.

== Research ==
Lindell's main contributions are in the field of secure multiparty computation. Lindell's research initially focused on theoretical feasibility, and in particular in the area of protocol composition. Lindell has carried out extensive research on efficient two-party secure computation via the Yao garbled circuit construction, and on efficient multiparty computation for the multiparty honest-majority setting based on Secret sharing. His most cited work is a joint paper with Benny Pinkas on privacy preserving data mining in which the use of secure computation was proposed for performing data mining algorithms; in particular the ID3 algorithm. Lindell provided the first proof of security for the basic Yao protocol, and the first proof of security for the BGW protocol. Lindell has also worked on the design of two-party protocols which are secure against active adversaries, the introduction of the concept of covert adversarial models, and much more. Lindell won the IBM Pat Goldberg Memorial Best Paper Award in Computer Science, Electrical Engineering and Math in 2006 for his work on the composition of Authenticated Byzantine Agreement, and the best paper award at ACM CCS 2016 for work on high-throughput MPC protocols. In 2021, Lindell published a review article on secure multiparty computation in the Communications of the ACM.

Lindell is also the co-inventor of the AES-GCM-SIV mode of operation for symmetric encryption, standardized by the IETF Crypto Forum Research Group in RFC 8452. He received the best paper award at ACM CCS 2017 for the research paper behind AES-GCM-SIV.

Lindell is also the author of a textbook with Jonathan Katz on modern cryptography. This textbook is utilized in many universities around the world as a standard reference work.

== Books ==
- Yehuda Lindell (2003). Composition of Secure Multi-Party Protocols: A Comprehensive Study. Springer. ISBN 978-3540201052.
- Jonathan Katz and Yehuda Lindell (2007). Introduction to Modern Cryptography. Chapman and Hall. ISBN 978-1584885511.
- Carmit Hazay and Yehuda Lindell (2010). Efficient Secure Two-Party Protocols: Techniques and Constructions. Springer. ISBN 978-3642143021.
- Yehuda Lindell, ed. (2014). Proceedings of the 11th Theory of Cryptography Conference. Springer. ISBN 978-3642542411.
- Jonathan Katz and Yehuda Lindell (2014). Introduction to Modern Cryptography, 2nd Edition. Chapman and Hall. ISBN 978-1466570269.
- Yehuda Lindell, ed. (2017). Tutorials on the Foundations of Cryptography. Springer. ISBN 978-3-319-57047-1.
- Jonathan Katz and Yehuda Lindell (2020). Introduction to Modern Cryptography, 3rd Edition. Chapman and Hall. ISBN 978-0815354369.
