= OPRF =

OPRF may refer to:

- Oak Park and River Forest High School, Chicago, Illinois, United States
- Oblivious pseudorandom function, a cryptographic function
