= Hybrid argument (cryptography) =

Cryptographic proof technique

In cryptography, the hybrid argument is a proof technique used to show that two distributions are computationally indistinguishable.

== History ==
Hybrid arguments had their origin in papers by Andrew Yao in 1982 and Shafi Goldwasser and Silvio Micali in 1983.

== Formal description ==
Formally, to show two distributions D_{1} and D_{2} are computationally indistinguishable, we can define a sequence of hybrid distributions D_{1} := H_{0}, H_{1}, ..., H_{t} =: D_{2} where t is polynomial in the security parameter n. Define the advantage of any probabilistic efficient (polynomial-bounded time) algorithm A as

$$\mathsf{Adv}_{H_i, H_{i+1}}^{\mathsf{dist}}(\mathbf{A}) := \left|\Pr[x \stackrel{\$}{\gets} H_i : \mathbf{A}(x)=1] - \Pr[x \stackrel{\$}{\gets} H_{i+1} : \mathbf{A}(x)=1] \right|,$$

where the dollar symbol ($) denotes that we sample an element from the distribution at random.

By triangle inequality, it is clear that for any probabilistic polynomial time algorithm A,

$$\mathsf{Adv}_{D_1, D_2}^{\mathsf{dist}}(\mathbf{A}) \leq \sum_{i=0}^{t-1}\mathsf{Adv}_{H_i, H_{i+1}}^{\mathsf{dist}}(\mathbf{A}).$$

Thus there must exist some k s.t. 0 ≤ k < t(n) and

$$\mathsf{Adv}_{H_k, H_{k+1}}^{\mathsf{dist}}(\mathbf{A}) \geq \mathsf{Adv}_{D_1, D_2}^{\mathsf{dist}}(\mathbf{A})/t(n).$$

Since t is polynomial-bounded, for any such algorithm A, if we can show that it has a fixed negligible advantage function ε(n) between distributions H_{i} and H_{i+1} for every i, so in particular,

$$\epsilon(n) \ge \mathsf{Adv}_{H_k, H_{k+1}}^{\mathsf{dist}}(\mathbf{A}) \geq \mathsf{Adv}_{D_1, D_2}^{\mathsf{dist}}(\mathbf{A})/t(n),$$

then it immediately follows that its advantage to distinguish the distributions D_{1} = H_{0} and D_{2} = H_{t} must also be negligible.

== Applications ==
The hybrid argument is extensively used in cryptography. Some simple proofs using hybrid arguments are:

- If one cannot efficiently predict the next bit of the output of some number generator, then this generator is a pseudorandom number generator (PRG).
- We can securely expand a PRG with 1-bit output into a PRG with n-bit output.

== See also ==
- Interactive proof system
- Universal composability
