= IIIS =

IIIS may refer to:

- The Institute for Integrated and Intelligent Systems of Griffith University, Australia
- The Institute for Interdisciplinary Information Sciences, Tsinghua University, China
- Fairey Fox IIIS, aircraft
