= Jonathan Katz (disambiguation) =

Jonathan Katz is an American actor.

Jonathan Katz may also refer to:

- Jonathan Katz (computer scientist)
- Jonathan David Katz (born 1958), professor of queer studies
- Jonathan Ned Katz (born 1938), historian of human sexuality
- Jon Katz (born 1947), technology writer
- Jonathan M. Katz (born 1980), American journalist and author
- Jonathan Katz, CEO of Katz Broadcasting, now a subsidiary of the E. W. Scripps Company
