= Phi-hiding assumption =

The phi-hiding assumption or Φ-hiding assumption is an assumption about the difficulty of finding small factors of φ(m) where m is a number whose factorization is unknown, and φ is Euler's totient function. The security of many modern cryptosystems comes from the perceived difficulty of certain problems. Since P vs. NP problem is still unresolved, cryptographers cannot be sure computationally intractable problems exist. Cryptographers thus make assumptions as to which problems are hard. It is commonly believed that if m is the product of two large primes, then calculating φ(m) is currently computationally infeasible; this assumption is required for the security of the RSA cryptosystem. The Φ-hiding assumption is a stronger assumption, namely that if p_{1} and p_{2} are small primes exactly one of which divides φ(m), there is no polynomial-time algorithm which can distinguish which of the primes p_{1} and p_{2} divides φ(m) with probability significantly greater than one-half.

This assumption was first stated in the 1999 paper titled Computationally Private Information Retrieval with Polylogarithmic Communication, where it was used in a private information retrieval scheme.

== Applications ==
The phi-hiding assumption has found applications in the construction of a few cryptographic primitives. Some of the constructions include:

- Computationally private information retrieval with polylogarithmic communication (1999)
- Efficient private bidding and auctions with an oblivious third party (1999)
- Single-database private information retrieval with constant communication rate (2005)
- Password authenticated key exchange using hidden smooth subgroups (2005)
