= Danish Sugar Beet Auction =

First large-scale and practical use of secure multi-party computation

The Danish Sugar Beet Auction was the first large-scale and practical application of secure multi-party computation, which took place in January 2008. An electronic double auction was successfully run by a multiparty computation involving representatives of Denmark's only sugar beets processor (Danisco), the Danish sugar beet growers' association, and a research group responsible for implementing and running the computation.

Due to European Union sugar market policy reforms which reduced sugar subsidies and lowered prices, as well as the recent closure of one of Danisco's sugar processing plants, the Danish sugar beet industry needed to reallocate production contracts to farmers nation-wide in an attempt to retain market efficiency. The decision made was to hold an electronic double auction to find the new market clearing price of sugar beets, where the role of the "auctioneer" was played by a computer program implementing a secure multi-party computation (SMPC) between the farmers and Danisco.

The use of SMPC not only reduced expenses of the auction process (when compared to hiring an external consultancy to run the auction), but also allowed farmers' bids to remain private from Danisco, the only sugar beets processor on the Danish market and the seller of production contracts. This was important as farmers' bids can reveal their individual economic positions and productivities, which Danisco could have hypothetically used to their advantage when selling contracts. In a survey of the auction participants, 80% of respondents indicated that it was important to them that the bids were kept confidential.

Aside from organizing the logistics of such a novel auction, the actual computation of the market clearing price and each bidder's positions only took about 30 minutes to complete. Ultimately, the auction resulted in the transfer of 25 thousand tons of production rights between farmers.
