= Privacy-preserving computational geometry =

Privacy-preserving computational geometry is the research area on the intersection of the domains of secure multi-party computation (SMC) and computational geometry. Classical problems of computational geometry reconsidered from the point of view of SMC include shape intersection, private point inclusion problem, range searching, convex hull, and more.

A pioneering work in this area was a 2001 paper by Atallah and Du, in which the secure point in polygon inclusion and polygonal intersection problems were considered.

Other problems are computation of the distance between two private points and secure two-party point-circle inclusion problem.

== Problem statements ==
The problems use the conventional "Alice and Bob" terminology. In all problems the required solution is a protocol of information exchange during which no additional information is revealed beyond what may be inferred from the answer to the required question.

- Point-in-polygon: Alice has a point a, and Bob has a polygon B. They need to determine whether a is inside B.
- Polygon pair intersection: Alice has a polygon A, and Bob has a polygon B. They need to determine whether A intersects B.
