= Jonathan Katz (computer scientist) =

American computer scientist

- Born: USA
- Education: BS MIT, 1996; Ph.D. Columbia University, 2002
- Scientific career
- Fields: Cryptography
- Workplaces: University of Maryland
- Doctoral advisor: Zvi Galil; Moti Yung; Rafail Ostrovsky

Jonathan Katz is a professor in the Department of Computer Science at the University of Maryland who conducts research on cryptography and cybersecurity. In 2019–2020 he was a faculty member in the Volgenau School of Engineering at George Mason University, where he held the title of Eminent Scholar in Cybersecurity. In 2013–2019 he was director of the Maryland Cybersecurity Center at the University of Maryland.

== Biography ==
Katz received BS degrees in mathematics and chemistry from MIT in 1996, followed by a master's degree in chemistry from Columbia University in 1998. After transferring to the computer science department, he received M.Phil. and PhD degrees in computer science from Columbia University in 2001 and 2002, respectively. Katz's doctoral advisors were Zvi Galil, Moti Yung, and Rafail Ostrovsky. While in graduate school, he worked as a research scientist at Telcordia Technologies (now ACS).

Katz was on the faculty in the computer science department of the University of Maryland from 2002 to 2019. From 2013 to 2019 he was director of the Maryland Cybersecurity Center there. He joined the Department of Computer Science of George Mason University as professor of computer science and Eminent Scholar in Cybersecurity in 2019, before returning to the University of Maryland one year later. In 2023, he took a leave of absence from the University of Maryland to serve as Chief Scientist at Dfns.

Katz has held visiting positions at UCLA, IBM T.J. Watson Research Center, and the Ecole Normale Superieure. He was a member of the DARPA Computer Science Study Group in 2009–2010. He also works as a consultant in the fields of cryptography and computer security.

== Research ==
Katz has worked on various aspects of cryptography, computer security, and theoretical computer science. His doctoral thesis was on designing protocols secure against man-in-the-middle attacks, most notably describing an efficient protocol for password-based authenticated key exchange. He has also worked in the areas of secure multi-party computation, public-key encryption, and digital signatures. He has served on the program committees of numerous conferences, including serving as co-program chair for the annual Crypto conference in 2016 and 2017 and co-program chair for the ACM Conference on Computer and Communications Security in 2019–2020. He is also currently an editor of the Journal of Cryptology, the premier journal of the field.

== Awards ==
Katz received the Humboldt Research Award to support collaborative research with colleagues in Germany during 2015. He also received the University of Maryland "Distinguished Scholar-Teacher" award in 2017. In 2019 Katz was named an IACR Fellow for his research contributions in public-key cryptography and cryptographic protocols along with his service and educational contributions to the cryptographic field. He also received the ACM SIGSAC Outstanding Contribution Award in 2019 for "his commitment to education in cryptography, through teaching and research, and for dedication to the advancement and increased influence of cryptographic research." He was named an ACM Fellow in 2021 for "contributions to cryptographic protocol design and cryptography education."

== Books ==
- Katz, Jonathan; Lindell, Yehuda (2007). Introduction to Modern Cryptography. Chapman and Hall. ISBN 978-1584885511. According to WorldCat, the book is held in 310 libraries. The second edition of this book was published in 2014, and the third edition was published in 2020.
- Jonathan Katz (2010). Digital Signatures. Springer. ISBN 978-0387277110. According to WorldCat, the book is held in 348 libraries
- Coeditor with Moti Yung of Applied Cryptography and Network Security: 5th International Conference, ACNS 2007, Zhuhai, China, June 5–8, 2007 : Proceedings. Berlin: Springer, 2007.
