= Multi-party fair exchange protocol =

In cryptography, a multi-party fair exchange protocol is protocol where parties accept to deliver an item if and only if they receive an item in return.

== Definition ==
Matthew K. Franklin and Gene Tsudik suggested in 1998 the following classification:

- An $n$-party single-unit general exchange is a permutation $\sigma$ on $\{1...n\}$, where each party $P_i$ offers a single unit of commodity $K_i$ to $P_{\sigma(i)}$, and receives a single unit of commodity $K_{\sigma^{-1}(i)}$ from $P_{\sigma^{-1}(i)}$.
- An $n$-party multi-unit general exchange is a matrix of baskets, where the entry $B_{ij}$ in row $i$ and column $j$ is the basket of goods given by $P_i$ to $P_j$.

== See also ==
Secure multi-party computation
