= Institute for Interdisciplinary Information Sciences =

Research institute of Tsinghua University

Coordinates: 39.998040°N 116.329724°E

- Traditional Chinese: 清華大學交叉信息研究院
- Simplified Chinese: 清华大学交叉信息研究院
Transcriptions
Standard Mandarin
- Hanyu Pinyin: Qīnghuá Dàxué Jiāochā Xìnxī Yánjiùyuàn

The Institute for Interdisciplinary Information Sciences (IIIS, Chinese: 清华大学交叉信息研究院) is a research institute at Tsinghua University in Beijing, which conducts interdisciplinary research in computer science and quantum physics.

== History and structure ==
The institute was founded in 2010 by Turing Award winner Andrew Yao as a new overarching unit subsuming the Institute for Theoretical Computer Science (ITCS), which had been founded in 2005. In addition to the ITCS, the IIIS also encompasses several other units, including Tsinghua's Center for Quantum Information (CQI) as well as joint centers with MIT and the Chinese University of Hong Kong, Aarhus University, the University of Michigan, and the University of Waterloo.

Apart from the IIIS, other computer science-related units at Tsinghua University include the Department of Computer Science and Technology and the School of Software.

== Education ==
In addition to research, the institute is also involved in education at Tsinghua University. In 2005, the Special Pilot CS Class program (often called Yao Class) was started, aimed at providing a computer science education similar to that at MIT and Stanford University. Several alumni of this program have been listed in the renowned Forbes 30 Under 30 list. Others have become faculty members at institutions such as Princeton University. The institute also has graduate students.
