= Rafail Ostrovsky =

American cryptographer (born 1963)

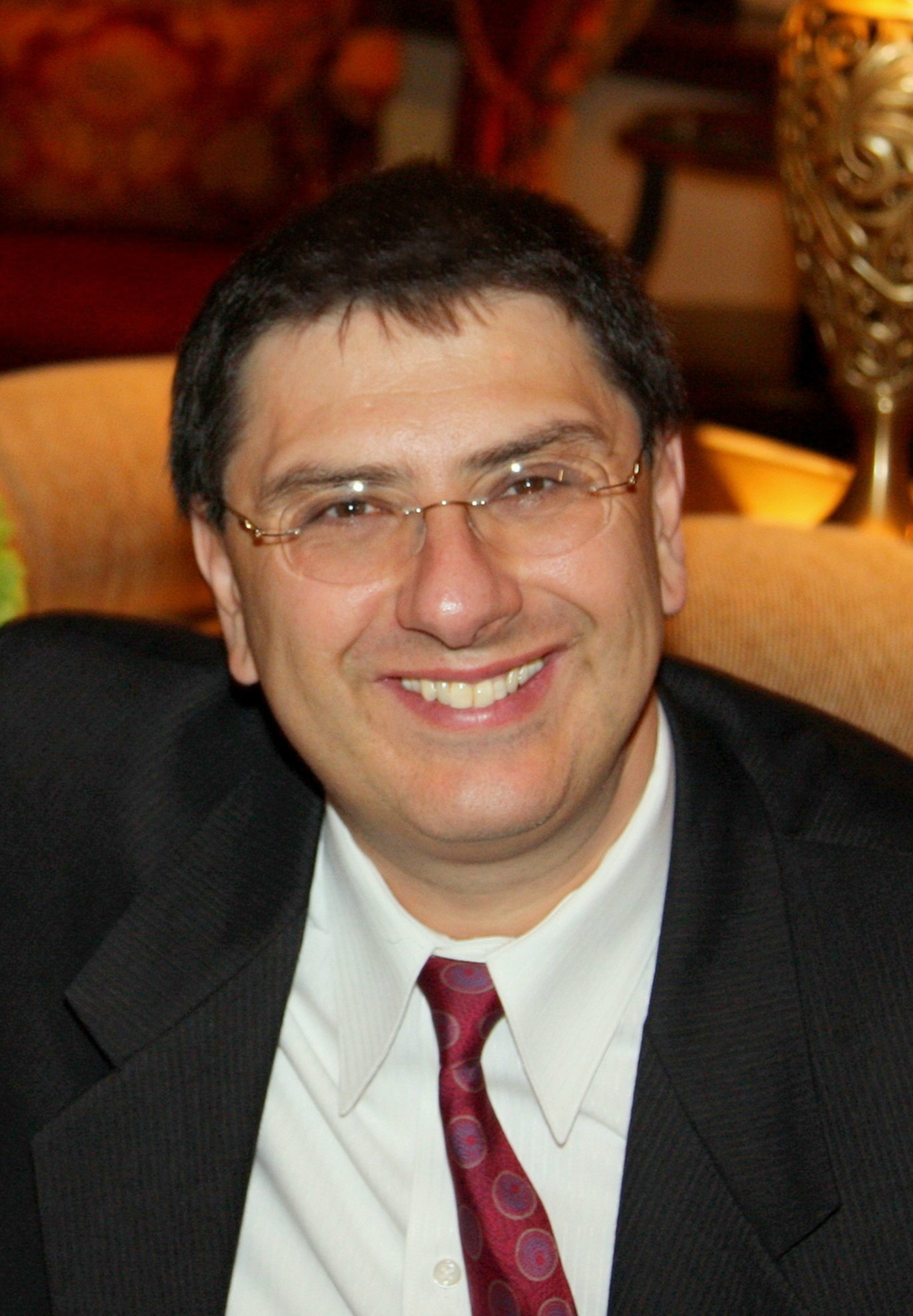
- Born: 1963 (age 62–63)
- Education: MIT
- Scientific career
- Fields: Algorithms and cryptography
- Workplaces: UCLA
- Thesis: Software Protection and Simulation on Oblivious RAMs (1992)
- Doctoral advisor: Silvio Micali
- Doctoral students: Jonathan Katz
- Website: www.cs.ucla.edu/~rafail/

Rafail Ostrovsky is a distinguished professor of computer science and mathematics at UCLA and a well-known researcher in algorithms and cryptography.

== Biography ==
Rafail Ostrovsky received his Ph.D. from MIT in 1992.

He is a member of the editorial board of Algorithmica , Editorial Board of Journal of Cryptology and Editorial and Advisory Board of the International Journal of Information and Computer Security.

== Awards ==
- 2022 W. Wallace McDowell Award "for visionary contributions to computer security theory and practice, including foreseeing new cloud vulnerabilities and then pioneering corresponding novel solutions"
- 2021 AAAS Fellow
- 2021 Fellow of the Association for Computing Machinery "for contributions to the foundations of cryptography"
- 2019 Academia Europaea Foreign Member
- 2018 RSA Award for Excellence in Mathematics "for contributions to the theory and to new variants of secure multi-party computations"
- 2017 IEEE Edward J. McCluskey Technical Achievement Award "for outstanding contributions to cryptographic protocols and systems, enhancing the scope of cryptographic applications and of assured cryptographic security."
- 2017 IEEE Fellow, "for contributions to cryptography”
- 2013 IACR Fellow "for numerous contributions to the scientific foundations of cryptography and for sustained educational leadership in cryptography"
- 1993 Henry Taub Prize

== Publications ==
Some of Ostrovsky's contributions to computer science include:

- 1990 Introduced (with R. Venkatesan and M. Yung) the notion of interactive hashing proved essential for constructing statistical zero-knowledge proofs for NP based on any one-way function (see NOVY and ECCC TR06-075).
- 1991 Introduced (with M. Yung) the notion of mobile adversary (later renamed proactive security) (see survey of Goldwasser
- 1990 Introduced the first poly-logarithmic Oblivious RAM (ORAM) scheme.
- 1993 Proved (with A. Wigderson) equivalence of one-way functions and zero-knowledge .
- 1996 Introduced (with R. Canetti, C. Dwork and M. Naor) the notion of deniable encryption .
- 1997 Introduced (with E. Kushilevitz) the first single server private information retrieval scheme .
- 1997 Showed (with E. Kushilevitz and Y. Rabani) (1+ε) poly-time and poly-size approximate-nearest neighbor search for high-dimensional data for L1-norm and Euclidean space.
