= Common reference string model =

In cryptography, the common reference string (CRS) model captures the assumption that a trusted setup in which all involved parties get access to the same string crs taken from some distribution D exists. Schemes proven secure in the CRS model are secure given that the setup was performed correctly. The common reference string model is a generalization of the common random string model, in which D is the uniform distribution of bit strings. As stated in, the CRS model is equivalent to the reference string model and the public parameters model.

The CRS model has applications in the study of non-interactive zero-knowledge proofs and universal composability.
