= Private information retrieval =

Information retrieval using cryptography

In cryptography, a private information retrieval (PIR) protocol is a protocol that allows a user to retrieve an item from a server in possession of a database without revealing which item is retrieved. PIR is a weaker version of 1-out-of-n oblivious transfer, where it is also required that the user should not get information about other database items.

One trivial, but very inefficient way to achieve PIR is for the server to send an entire copy of the database to the user. In fact, this is the only possible protocol (in the classical or the quantum setting) that gives the user information-theoretic privacy for their query in a single-server setting. There are two ways to address this problem: make the server computationally bounded or assume that there are multiple non-cooperating servers, each having a copy of the database.

The problem was introduced in 1995 by Chor, Goldreich, Kushilevitz and Sudan in the information-theoretic setting and in 1997 by Kushilevitz and Ostrovsky in the computational setting. Since then, very efficient solutions have been discovered. Single database (computationally private) PIR can be achieved with constant (amortized) communication and k-database (information theoretic) PIR can be done with $n^{O\left(\frac{\log \log k}{k \log k}\right)}$ communication.

== Advances in computational PIR ==
The first single-database computational PIR scheme to achieve communication complexity less than $n$ was created in 1997 by Kushilevitz and Ostrovsky and achieved communication complexity of $n^\epsilon$ for any $\epsilon$, where $n$ is the number of bits in the database. The security of their scheme was based on the well-studied quadratic residuosity problem. In 1999, Christian Cachin, Silvio Micali and Markus Stadler achieved poly-logarithmic communication complexity. The security of their system is based on the phi-hiding assumption. In 2004, Helger Lipmaa achieved log-squared communication complexity $O(\ell \log n+k \log^2 n)$, where $\ell$ is the length of the strings and $k$ is the security parameter. The security of his system reduces to the semantic security of a length-flexible additively homomorphic cryptosystem like the Damgård–Jurik cryptosystem. In 2005 Craig Gentry and Zulfikar Ramzan achieved log-squared communication complexity which retrieves log-square (consecutive) bits of the database. The security of their scheme is also based on a variant of the Phi-hiding assumption. The communication rate was finally brought down to $1$ by Aggelos Kiayias, Nikos Leonardos, Helger Lipmaa, Kateryna Pavlyk, Qiang Tang, in 2015.

All previous sublinear-communication computational PIR protocol required linear computational complexity of $\Omega (n)$ public-key operations. In 2009, Helger Lipmaa designed a computational PIR protocol with communication complexity $O(\ell \log n+k \log^2 n)$ and worst-case computation of $O (n / \log n)$ public-key operations. Amortization techniques that retrieve non-consecutive bits have been considered by Yuval Ishai, Eyal Kushilevitz, Rafail Ostrovsky and Amit Sahai.

As shown by Ostrovsky and Skeith, the schemes by Kushilevitz and Ostrovsky and Lipmaa use similar ideas based on homomorphic encryption. The Kushilevitz and Ostrovsky protocol is based on the Goldwasser–Micali cryptosystem while the protocol by Lipmaa is based on the Damgård–Jurik cryptosystem.

== Advances in information theoretic PIR ==
Achieving information theoretic security requires the assumption that there are multiple non-cooperating servers, each having a copy of the database. Without this assumption, any information-theoretically secure PIR protocol requires an amount of communication that is at least the size of the database n. Multi-server PIR protocols tolerant of non-responsive or malicious/colluding servers are called robust or Byzantine robust respectively. These issues were first considered by Beimel and Stahl (2002). An ℓ-server system that can operate where only k of the servers respond, ν of the servers respond incorrectly, and which can withstand up to t colluding servers without revealing the client's query is called "t-private ν-Byzantine robust k-out-of-ℓ PIR" [DGH 2012]. In 2012, C. Devet, I. Goldberg, and N. Heninger (DGH 2012) proposed an optimally robust scheme that is Byzantine-robust to $\nu < k-t-1$ which is the theoretical maximum value. It is based on an earlier protocol of Goldberg that uses Shamir's Secret Sharing to hide the query. Goldberg has released a C++ implementation on SourceForge.

== Relation to other cryptographic primitives ==
One-way functions are necessary, but not known to be sufficient, for nontrivial (i.e., with sublinear communication) single database computationally private information retrieval. In fact, such a protocol was proved by Giovanni Di Crescenzo, Tal Malkin and Rafail Ostrovsky to imply oblivious transfer (see below).

Symmetric PIR is PIR with the additional restriction that the user may not learn any item other than the one she requested. It is termed symmetric because both the user and the database have a privacy requirement. Oblivious transfer is a closely related notion with the same privacy requirements. The main difference is that in the context of PIR, nontriviality is in terms of achieving a communication cost sublinear in the database size. This is not a standard requirement of olibivous transfer protocols because achieving privacy for both parties is already non-trivial.

Collision-resistant cryptographic hash functions are implied by any one-round computational PIR scheme, as shown by Ishai, Kushilevitz and Ostrovsky.

== PIR variations ==
The basic motivation for private information retrieval is a family of two-party protocols in which one of the parties (the sender) owns a database, and the other part (the receiver) wants to query it with certain privacy restrictions and warranties. So, as a result of the protocol, if the receiver wants the i-th value in the database he must learn the i-th entry, but the sender must learn nothing about i. In a general PIR protocol, a computationally unbounded sender can learn nothing about i so privacy is theoretically preserved. Since the PIR problem was posed, different approaches to its solution have been pursued and some variations were proposed.

A CPIR (computationally private information retrieval) protocol is similar to a PIR protocol: the receiver retrieves an element chosen by him from the sender's database, so that the sender obtains no knowledge about which element was transferred. The only difference is that privacy is safeguarded against a polynomially bounded sender.

A CSPIR (computationally symmetric private information retrieval) protocol is used in a similar scenario in which a CPIR protocol is used. If the sender owns a database, and the receiver wants to get the i-th value in this database, at the end of the execution of a SPIR protocol, the receiver should have learned nothing about values in the database other than the i-th one.

== PIR implementations ==
Numerous Computational PIR and Information theoretic PIR schemes in the literature have been implemented. Here is an incomplete list:

- MuchPIR is a CPIR implementation as a Postgres C/C++ Extension [GitHub, 2021].
- SealPIR is a fast CPIR implementation [ACLS 2018].
- Popcorn is a PIR implementation tailored for media [GCMSAW 2016].
- Percy++ includes implementations of [AG 2007, DGH 2012, CGKS 1998, Goldberg 2007, HOG 2011, LG 2015].
- RAID-PIR is an implementation of the ITPIR scheme of [DHS 2014].
- XPIR is a fast CPIR implementation [ABFK 2014].
- upPIR is an ITPIR implementation [Cappos 2013].

== See also ==
- k-anonymity
- Locally decodable code
