= Innovations in Theoretical Computer Science =

- Abbreviation: ITCS
- Discipline: Theoretical computer science

Publication details
- Publisher: Leibniz Center for Informatics
- History: 2010–
- Frequency: annual
- Website: http://itcs-conf.org/

The Conference on Innovations in Theoretical Computer Science is an academic conference about theoretical computer science. The conference was initiated by Andrew Yao in 2010, and was originally called Innovations in Computer Science. The proceedings were hosted online in 2010 and 2011, were published in the ACM Digital Library from 2012 to 2016, and were published as open access in the LIPIcs collection from 2017 onwards.

As of 2022, the conference is listed by Google Scholar as the 8th venue in theoretical computer science according to the h5-index metric. It is indexed by the DBLP bibliographical database.
