= Institute for Theoretical Computer Science =

Chinese research institute

- Traditional Chinese: 清華大學理論計算機科學研究中心
- Simplified Chinese: 清华大学理论计算机科学研究中心
Transcriptions
Standard Mandarin
- Hanyu Pinyin: Qīnghuá Dàxué Lǐlùn Jìsuànjī Kēxué Yánjiū Zhōngxīn

The Institute for Theoretical Computer Science (ITCS; Chinese: 清华大学理论计算机科学研究中心) is a scholastic research institute headed by Professor Andrew Yao at Tsinghua University in Beijing. In 2010, the institute became part of Tsinghua University's Institute for Interdisciplinary Information Sciences.

The ITCS has hosted several academic events, including the tenth International Conference on Theory and Practice of Public-Key Cryptography (PKC) on April 16–20, 2007.
