= Andrew Yao =

Chinese computer scientist, physicist, and computational theorist

Andrew Chi-Chih Yao
- 姚期智
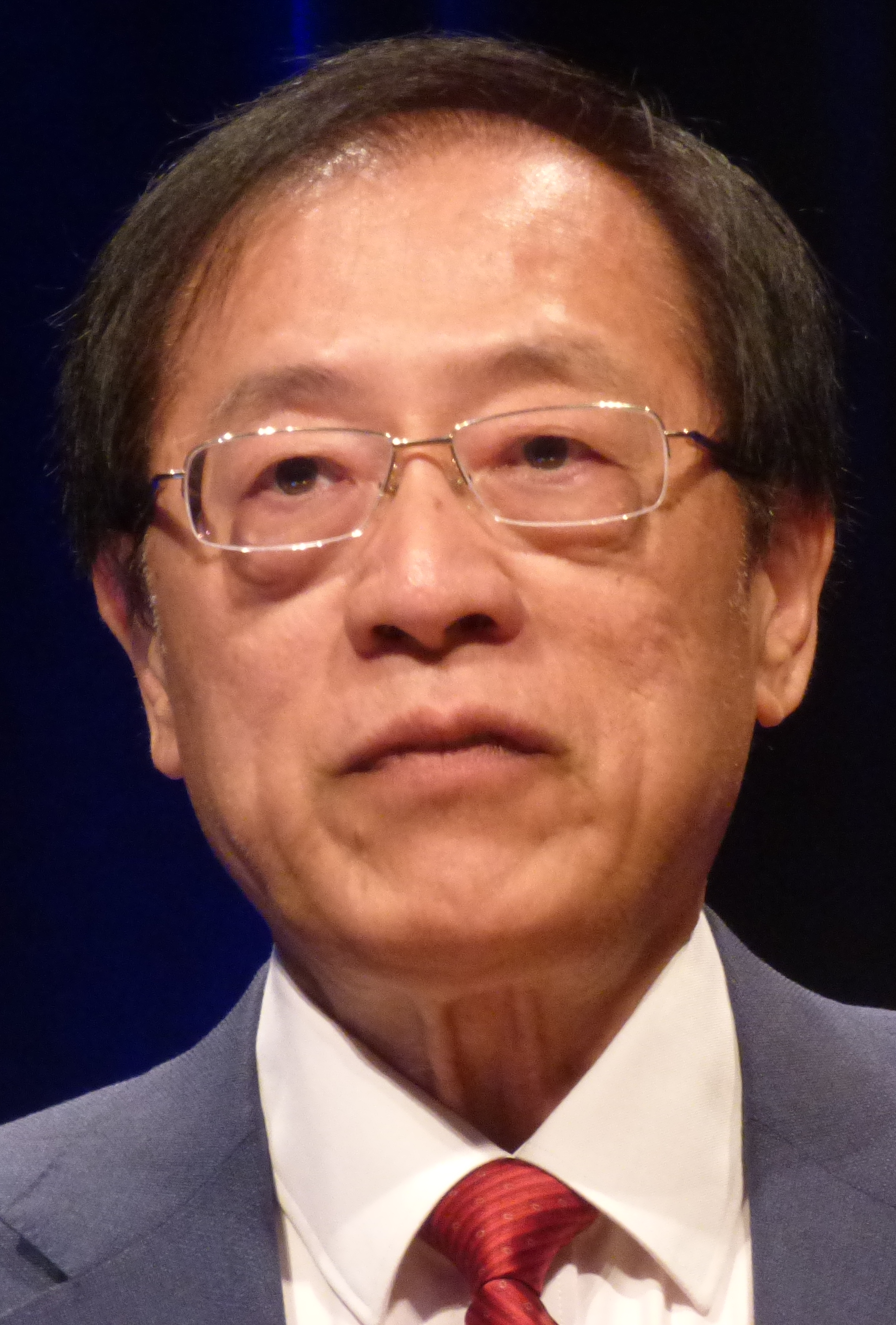
- Yao in 2015
- Born: December 24, 1946 (age 79); Shanghai, China
- Citizenship: Republic of China (1946–2015); United States (?–2015); People's Republic of China (2015–present)
- Education: National Taiwan University (BS); Harvard University (MA, PhD); University of Illinois, Urbana-Champaign (PhD)
- Known for: Yao's principle Communication complexity Dolev–Yao model Garbled circuit Hybrid argument Yao's Millionaires' Problem; Yao's test Yao graph
- Spouse: Frances Yao
- Awards: George Pólya Prize (1987); Knuth Prize (1996); Turing Award (2000); Kyoto Prize (2021)
- Scientific career
- Fields: Computer science Theoretical physics
- Workplaces: Massachusetts Institute of Technology; Stanford University; University of California, Berkeley; Princeton University; Tsinghua University; Chinese University of Hong Kong
- Theses: Internal Symmetries and Positivity (1969, Harvard); A Study of Concrete Computational Complexity (1975, Illinois)
- Doctoral advisor: Sheldon Glashow (Harvard); Chung Laung Liu (Illinois)
- Notable students: William A. Dembski

Chinese name
- Chinese: 姚期智
Transcriptions
Standard Mandarin
- Hanyu Pinyin: Yáo Qīzhì
- Wade–Giles: Yao^{2} Ch'i^{1}chih^{4}

Andrew Chi-Chih Yao (Chinese: 姚期智; pinyin: Yáo Qīzhì; born December 24, 1946) is a Chinese computer scientist, theoretical physicist, and computational theorist. He is currently a professor and the dean of Institute for Interdisciplinary Information Sciences (IIIS) at Tsinghua University. Yao used the minimax theorem to prove what is now known as Yao's principle.

After graduating from National Taiwan University, Yao earned a doctorate in physics from Harvard University in 1972 and a second doctorate in computer science from the University of Illinois in 1975 before teaching mathematics and computer science as a professor at the Massachusetts Institute of Technology, Stanford University, and the University of California, Berkeley. In 1986, he became the William and Edna Macaleer Professor of Engineering and Applied Science at Princeton University. He won the 2000 ACM Turing Award.

Yao was a naturalized U.S. citizen, and worked for many years in the U.S. In 2015, together with Yang Chen-Ning, he renounced his U.S. citizenship and became an academician of the Chinese Academy of Sciences.

== Early life and education ==
Yao was born in Shanghai (then part of the Republic of China) on December 24, 1946. His parents later moved to Hong Kong and then Taiwan, where Yao was raised.

After attending Taipei Municipal Chien Kuo High School, Yao graduated from National Taiwan University with his Bachelor of Science (B.S.) in physics in 1967. He then pursued graduate studies in the United States at Harvard University, where he earned his Master of Arts (M.A.) degree in physics in 1969 and then his Ph.D. in theoretical physics in 1972. His doctoral dissertation at Harvard, completed under Nobel Prize laureate Sheldon Glashow, was titled, "Internal Symmetries and Positivity".

In 1975, after only two years of study, Yao completed a second Ph.D. in computer science from the University of Illinois at Urbana–Champaign as a fellow of the National Science Foundation. His second doctoral dissertation, "A Study of Concrete Computational Complexity," was supervised by Taiwanese computer scientist Chung Laung Liu.

== Academic career ==
Yao was an assistant professor at Massachusetts Institute of Technology (1975–1976), assistant professor at Stanford University (1976–1981), and professor at the University of California, Berkeley (1981–1982). From 1982 to 1986, he was a full professor at Stanford University. From 1986 to 2004, Yao was the William and Edna Macaleer Professor of Engineering and Applied Science at Princeton University, where he continued to work on algorithms and complexity. In 2004, Yao became a professor of the Center for Advanced Study, Tsinghua University (CASTU) and the director of the Institute for Theoretical Computer Science (ITCS), Tsinghua University in Beijing. Since 2010, he has served as the Dean of Institute for Interdisciplinary Information Sciences (IIIS) in Tsinghua University. In 2010, he initiated the Conference on Innovations in Theoretical Computer Science (ITCS). Yao is also the Distinguished Professor-at-Large in the Chinese University of Hong Kong.

In May 2024, Yao joined fellow AI researchers Yoshua Bengio, Geoffrey Hinton, and others in publishing an expert consensus paper describing the extreme risks posed by AI. The authors warned that AI safety research is lagging, and outlined "proactive, adaptive governance mechanisms" for policymakers ahead of the AI Seoul Summit.

== Awards ==
In 1996, Yao was awarded the Knuth Prize. Yao also received the Turing Award in 2000, considered the "Nobel Prize" of computer science, "in recognition of his fundamental contributions to the theory of computation, including the complexity-based theory of pseudorandom number generation, cryptography, and communication complexity". In 2021, Yao received the Kyoto Prize in Advanced Technology. In 2022, he was listed on the Asian Scientist 100.

Yao is a member of U.S. National Academy of Sciences, a fellow of the American Academy of Arts and Sciences, a fellow of the American Association for the Advancement of Science, a fellow of the Association for Computing Machinery, and an academician of Chinese Academy of Sciences. His wife, Frances Yao, is also a theoretical computer scientist.

== See also ==
- Communication complexity
- List of pioneers in computer science
