= Oded Goldreich =

Israeli computer scientist (born 1957)

- עודד גולדרייך
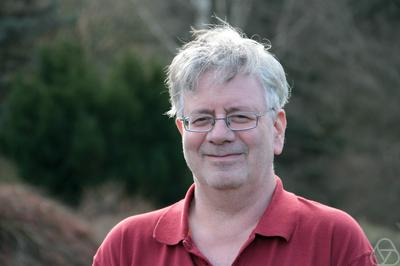
- Goldreich at Oberwolfach in 2015
- Born: 4 February 1957 (age 69); Tel Aviv, Israel
- Education: Technion, Weizmann Institute
- Known for: Zero-knowledge proof
- Spouse: Dana Ron
- Awards: Knuth Prize (2017); Israel Prize (2021)
- Scientific career
- Fields: Cryptography
- Doctoral advisor: Shimon Even
- Doctoral students: Boaz Barak; Ran Canetti; Hugo Krawczyk; Yehuda Lindell; Erez Petrank
- Website: www.wisdom.weizmann.ac.il/~oded/

Oded Goldreich (Hebrew: עודד גולדרייך; born 1957) is a professor of computer science at the faculty of mathematics and computer science of the Weizmann Institute of Science, Israel. His research interests lie within the theory of computation and are, specifically, the interplay of randomness and computation, the foundations of cryptography, and computational complexity theory. He won the Knuth Prize in 2017 and was selected in 2021 to receive the Israel Prize in mathematics. He is a member of the Israel Academy of Sciences and Humanities.

== Biography ==
Goldreich received a DSc in computer science at Technion in 1983 under Shimon Even.

Goldreich has contributed to the development of pseudorandomness, zero knowledge proofs, secure function evaluation, property testing, and other areas in cryptography and computational complexity.

Goldreich has also authored several books including: Foundations of Cryptography which comes in two volumes (volume 1 in 2001 and volume 2 in 2004), Computational Complexity: A Conceptual Perspective (2008), and Modern Cryptography, Probabilistic Proofs and Pseudorandomness (1998).

== Awards ==
Goldreich received the Knuth Prize in 2017 for "fundamental and lasting contributions to theoretical computer science in many areas including cryptography, randomness, probabilistically checkable proofs, inapproximability, property testing as well as complexity theory in general. Goldreich has, in addition to his outstanding research contributions, advanced these fields through many survey articles and several first-class textbooks. He has contributed eminent results, new basic definitions and pointed to new directions of research. Goldreich has been one of the driving forces for the theoretical computer science community for three decades."

=== Israel Prize and controversy ===
In 2021 he was selected by committee to receive the Israel Prize in mathematics. Education Minister Yoav Gallant vetoed his selection because of Goldreich's alleged support of the boycott, divestment and sanctions movement (BDS) against Israel. One of the reasons for the decision was a letter signed by Goldreich calling for the German parliament not to equate BDS with anti-semitism. However, according to Goldreich, he did not support BDS but instead signed a petition calling for the halt of EU funding to Ariel University in the occupied West Bank. The prize committee petitioned the Supreme Court of Israel to ensure that Goldreich would receive the prize. On 8 April 2021 Israel's Supreme Court of Justice ruled in favor of Gallant's petition so that Goldreich could receive the prize that year, giving Gallant a month to further examine the issue. On 11 April 2021, a 2004 Israeli Prize winner, Professor David Harel, decided to share his award with Goldreich in protest of the government's decision to not award the 2021 prize to Goldreich. In August 2021 the Supreme Court wrote, "we found appropriate at this stage to accept the position of the Attorney General that the Education Minister should be allowed to examine new information that he received only two days ago regarding a petition that Professor Goldreich signed that was publicized around two weeks ago." This meant that the matter should be resolved by the new Minister of Education Yifat Shasha-Biton. In November 2021, Shasha-Biton announced that she would block Goldreich from receiving the prize. In December 2021 Attorney General Mandelblit told the High Court that Goldreich should be given the Israel Prize in Mathematics, despite Education Minister Shasha-Biton's opposition.

In an editorial, the Jerusalem Post wrote that Goldreich's "[c]alling for the boycott of professional colleagues ... is a red line that shouldn't be crossed". A Haaretz editorial said that Shasha-Biton's decision meant "the most prestigious prize awarded by Israel will not be the mark of scientific excellence but of loyalty to the government". In March 2022 the High Court of Israel finally ruled that the 2021 prize must be awarded to Goldreich.

== Personal life ==
He is married to Dana Ron, who is a computer scientist at Tel Aviv University, and has collaborated with Ron on approximation algorithms.

== See also ==
- Science and technology in Israel
