= Clifford Cocks =

British cryptographer (born 1950)

Clifford Cocks CB FRS
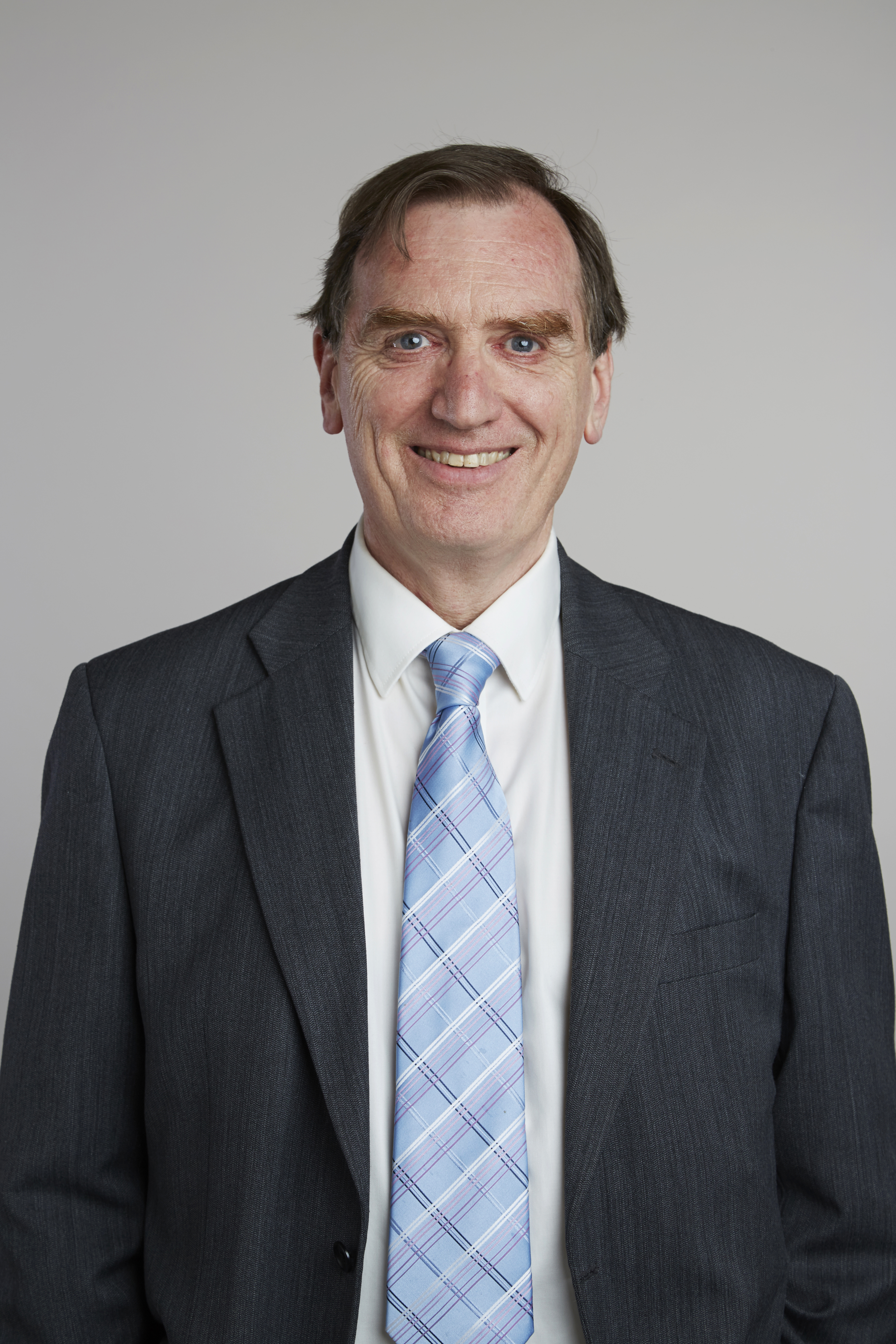
- Clifford Cocks at the Royal Society admissions day in London, July 2015
- Born: Clifford Christopher Cocks; 28 December 1950 (age 75); Prestbury, Cheshire, England, United Kingdom
- Education: Manchester Grammar School
- Alma mater: University of Cambridge (BA)
- Known for: RSA encryption; Public-key cryptography; Cocks IBE scheme
- Scientific career
- Fields: Cryptography
- Workplaces: Government Communications Headquarters; University of Oxford

Clifford Christopher Cocks CB FRS (born 28 December 1950) is a British mathematician and cryptographer. In the early 1970s, while working at the United Kingdom Government Communications Headquarters (GCHQ), he developed an early public-key cryptography (PKC) system. This pre-dated commercial offerings, but due to the classified nature of Cocks' work, it did not become widely known until 1997 when the work was declassified.

As his work was not available for public review until 1997, it had no impact on numerous commercial initiatives relating to Internet security that had been commercially developed and that were well established by 1997. His work was technically aligned with the Diffie–Hellman key exchange and elements of the RSA algorithm; these systems were independently developed and commercialized.

== Education ==
Cocks was educated at Manchester Grammar School and went on to study the Mathematical Tripos as an undergraduate at King's College, Cambridge. He continued as a PhD student at the University of Oxford, where he specialised in number theory under Bryan Birch, but left academia without finishing his doctorate.

== Career ==
=== Non-secret encryption ===
Cocks left Oxford to join Communications-Electronics Security Group (CESG), an arm of GCHQ, in September 1973. Soon after, Nick Patterson told Cocks about James H. Ellis' non-secret encryption, an idea which had been published in 1969 but never successfully implemented. Several people had attempted creating the required one-way functions, but Cocks, with his background in number theory, decided to use prime factorization, and did not even write it down at the time. With this insight, he quickly developed what later became known as the RSA encryption algorithm.

GCHQ was not able to find a way to use the algorithm, and treated it as classified information. The scheme was also passed to the NSA. With a military focus, financial considerations, and low computing power, the power of public-key cryptography was unrealised in both organisations:

I judged it most important for military use. In a fluid military situation you may meet unforeseen threats or opportunities. ... if you can share your key rapidly and electronically, you have a major advantage over your opponent. Only at the end of the evolution from Berners-Lee [in 1989] designing an open internet architecture for CERN, its adaptation and adoption for the Arpanet ... did public key cryptography realise its full potential. -Ralph Benjamin

In 1977, the algorithm was independently invented and published by Rivest, Shamir and Adleman, who named it after their initials. There is no evidence of a hint or leak, conscious or unconscious, and Cocks has dismissed the idea. The British achievement remained secret until 1997.

=== Public revelation ===
In 1987, the GCHQ had plans to release the work, but Peter Wright's Spycatcher MI5 memoir caused them to delay revealing the research by ten years. 24 years after its discovery, on 18 December 1997, Cocks revealed the GCHQ history of public-key research in a public talk. James Ellis had died on 25 November 1997, a month before the public announcement was made.

=== Identity-based encryption ===
In 2001, Cocks developed one of the first secure identity-based encryption (IBE) schemes, based on assumptions about quadratic residues in composite groups. The Cocks IBE scheme is not widely used in practice due to its high degree of ciphertext expansion. However, it is currently one of the few IBE schemes which do not use bilinear pairings, and rely for security on more well-studied mathematical problems.

=== Awards and honours ===
In 1968, Cocks won a silver medal at the 10th International Mathematical Olympiad.

Cocks held the post of Chief Mathematician at GCHQ. He established the Heilbronn Institute for Mathematical Research at the University of Bristol.

Cocks was made a Companion of the Order of the Bath in 2008 (the citation describes him as "Counsellor, Foreign and Commonwealth Office"). He was awarded an honorary degree from the University of Bristol in 2008, and an honorary Doctor of Science from the University of Birmingham in 2015.

With James Ellis and Malcolm Williamson, Cocks was honoured for his part in the development of public-key cryptography by the Institute of Electrical and Electronics Engineers (IEEE) in 2010 and by induction into the Cryptologic Hall of Honor in 2021.

Cocks was elected a Fellow of the Royal Society (FRS) in 2015. His certificate of election reads:

Clifford Cocks is distinguished for his work in cryptography. He was the first to devise a practicable implementation of public key cryptography, and more recently a practicable scheme for identity based public key encryption. Such achievements have been fundamental in ensuring the security of the world's electronic communications, security that we now take for granted.
