= SM9 =

SM9 may refer to:

- SM9 (classification), a swimming disability category
- SM9 (cryptography standard), a Chinese national cryptography standard
- SM-9, a machine gun
