= Dan Boneh =

Israeli–American professor

- דן בונה
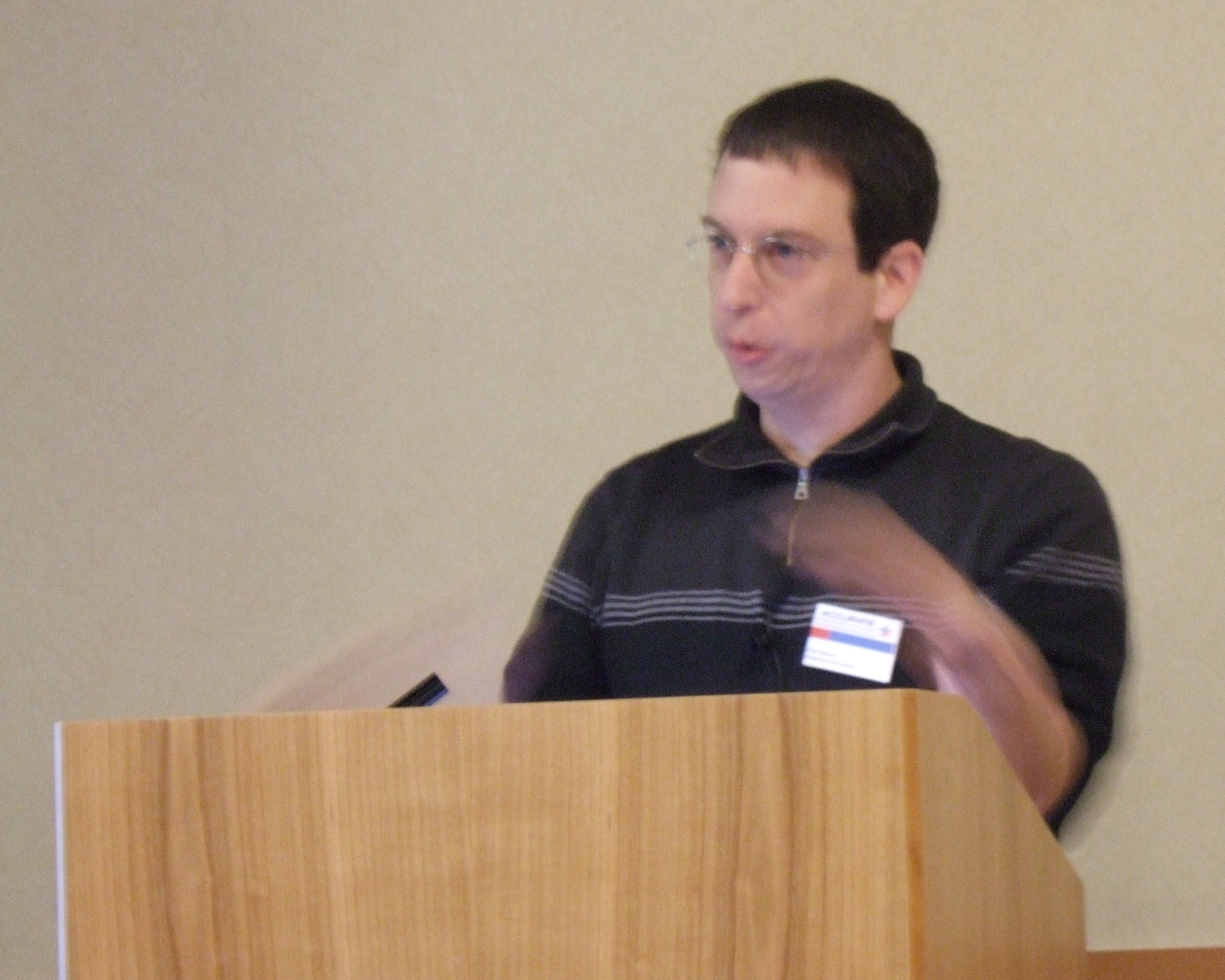
- Boneh in 2007
- Born: 1969 (age 56–57); Israel
- Education: Princeton University (PhD)
- Known for: Pairing-based cryptography; BLS signature scheme; ID-based encryption
- Awards: ACM Prize in Computing; Gödel Prize; National Academy of Engineering (2016); National Academy of Sciences (2023); Selfridge Prize; Sloan Research Fellowship
- Scientific career
- Fields: Cryptography
- Workplaces: Stanford University
- Thesis: Studies in Computational Number Theory with Applications to Cryptography (1996)
- Doctoral advisor: Richard J. Lipton
- Doctoral students: Craig Gentry; Hovav Shacham

Dan Boneh (/boʊˈneɪ/; Hebrew: דן בונה) is an Israeli–American professor in applied cryptography and computer security at Stanford University.

In 2016, Boneh was elected a member of the National Academy of Engineering for contributions to the theory and practice of cryptography and computer security.

== Biography ==
Born in Israel in 1969, Boneh obtained his Ph.D. in computer science from Princeton University in 1996 under the supervision of Richard J. Lipton.

Boneh is one of the principal contributors to the development of pairing-based cryptography, along with Matt Franklin of the University of California, Davis. He joined the faculty of Stanford University in 1997, and became professor of computer science and electrical engineering. He teaches massive open online courses on the online learning platform Coursera. In 1999, he was awarded a fellowship from the David and Lucile Packard Foundation. In 2002, he co-founded a company called Voltage Security with three of his students. The company was acquired by Hewlett-Packard in 2015.

In 2018, Boneh became co-director (with David Mazières) of the newly founded Center for Blockchain Research at Stanford, predicting at the time that "Blockchains will become increasingly critical to doing business globally." Dr. Boneh is also known for putting his entire introductory cryptography course online for free. The course is also available via Coursera.

== Awards ==
- 2021 Fellow of the American Mathematical Society
- 2020 Selfridge Prize with Jonathan Love
- 2016 Elected to the US National Academy of Engineering
- 2016 Fellow of the Association for Computing Machinery
- 2014 ACM Prize in Computing (formerly called the ACM-Infosys Foundation award)
- 2013 Gödel Prize, with Matthew K. Franklin and Antoine Joux, for his work on the Boneh–Franklin scheme
- 2005 RSA Award
- 1999 Sloan Research Fellowship
- 1999 Packard Award

== Publications ==
Boneh's primary research focuses is on the area of cryptography where he has worked in numerous areas.

=== Identity-Based Encryption ===
In 1984 Adi Shamir proposed the possibility of identity-based encryption (IBE), which allows people to send encrypted messages to each other by using a public key derived from the recipients identity. Boneh, with Matt Franklin, proposed one of the first identity-based encryption schemes based on the Weil pairing. The Boneh-Franklin scheme remains an active area of research. In 2010 Boneh (with Shweta Agrawal and Xavier Boyen) introduced an IBE scheme from the learning with errors assumption.

=== Homomorphic Encryption ===
A homomorphic encryption algorithm is one where a user can perform computation on encrypted data, without decrypting it. Boneh's has developed several improvements of homomorphic cryptosystems. For example, with Eu-Jin Goh and Kobbi Nissim in 2005 Boneh proposed a "partially homomorphic cryptosystem".

=== Timing attacks ===
Timing attacks are a type of side-channel attack that allows an adversary to attack a security system by studying now long it takes to perform certain calculations. In 2003, Boneh (with David Brumley) proposed one of the first practical timing attacks on OpenSSL that worked over the Internet. He then later showed how to extend the attack, "show[ing] that the time web sites take to respond to HTTP requests can leak private information."

=== Other significant work ===
Some of Boneh's other results in cryptography and computer security include:

- 2018: Verifiable Delay Functions
- 2015: Privacy-preserving proofs of solvency for Bitcoin exchanges
- 2010: He was involved in designing tcpcrypt, TCP extensions for transport-level security
- 2005: A partially homomorphic cryptosystem (with Eu-Jin Goh and Kobbi Nissim)
- 2005: The first broadcast encryption system with full collision resistance (with Craig Gentry and Brent Waters)
- 2005: PwdHash a browser extension that transparently produces a different password for each site
- 1999: Cryptanalysis of RSA when the private key is less than N^{0.292} (with Glenn Durfee)
- 1997: Fault-based cryptanalysis of public-key systems (with Richard J. Lipton and Richard DeMillo)
- 1995: Collision resistant fingerprinting codes for digital data (with James Shaw)
- 1995: Cryptanalysis using a DNA computer (with Christopher Dunworth and Richard J. Lipton)
