= Matthew K. Franklin =

American computer scientist

- Education: Pomona College; UC Berkeley; Columbia University
- Known for: Boneh-Franklin scheme
- Awards: Gödel Prize
- Scientific career
- Fields: Cryptography
- Workplaces: UC Davis
- Thesis: "Efficiency and Security of Distributed Protocols" (1994)
- Doctoral advisors: Zvi Galil; Moti Yung

Matthew Keith "Matt" Franklin is an American cryptographer, and a professor of computer science at the University of California, Davis.

== Education and employment ==
Franklin did his undergraduate studies at Pomona College, graduating in 1983 with a degree in mathematics, and was awarded a master's degree in mathematics in 1985 by the University of California, Berkeley. He earned his Ph.D. in computer science from Columbia University in 1994, under the joint supervision of Zvi Galil and Moti Yung. Prior to joining the UC Davis faculty in 2000, he worked at Xerox PARC, Bell Labs, and AT&T Labs.

From 2009 to 2014, Franklin was editor-in-chief of the Journal of Cryptology.

== Research contributions ==
Franklin is particularly known for the Boneh–Franklin scheme, a cryptography scheme he developed with Dan Boneh that uses the mathematics of elliptic curves to automatically generate public and private key pairs based on the identities of the communicating parties. In 2013, he and Boneh were winners of the Gödel Prize for their work on this system.

== Selected publications ==
- Franklin, Matthew K.; Reiter, Michael K. (1996), "The Design and Implementation of a Secure Auction Service", IEEE Transactions on Software Engineering, 22 (5): 302–312, Bibcode:1996ITSEn..22..302F, CiteSeerX 10.1.1.46.7960, doi:10.1109/32.502223.
- Cramer, Ronald; Franklin, Matthew; Schoenmakers, Berry; Yung, Moti (1996), "Multi-authority secret-ballot elections with linear work", Advances in cryptology—EUROCRYPT '96: International Conference on the Theory and Application of Cryptographic Techniques Saragossa, Spain, May 12–16, 1996, Proceedings, Lecture Notes in Computer Science, vol. 1070, Berlin: Springer, pp. 72–83, doi:10.1007/3-540-68339-9_7, ISBN 978-3-540-61186-8, MR 1421580.
- Franklin, Matthew K.; Reiter, Michael K. (1997), "Fair exchange with a semi-trusted third party", Proceedings of the 4th ACM Conference on Computer and Communications Security (CCS '97), pp. 1–5, CiteSeerX 10.1.1.46.7979, doi:10.1145/266420.266424, ISBN 978-0897919128, S2CID 296057.
- Boneh, Dan; Franklin, Matthew (1999), "An efficient public key traitor tracing scheme", Advances in Cryptology — CRYPTO' 99: 19th Annual International Cryptology Conference Santa Barbara, California, USA, August 15–19, 1999, Proceedings, Lecture Notes in Computer Science, vol. 1666, Springer, pp. 338–353, doi:10.1007/3-540-48405-1_22, ISBN 978-3-540-66347-8.
- Boneh, Dan; Franklin, Matthew (2001), "Efficient generation of shared RSA keys", Journal of the ACM, 48 (4): 702–722, CiteSeerX 10.1.1.22.859, doi:10.1145/502090.502094, MR 2144927, S2CID 14178777.
- Boneh, Dan; Franklin, Matthew (2003), "Identity-based encryption from the Weil pairing", SIAM Journal on Computing, 32 (3): 586–615, CiteSeerX 10.1.1.66.1131, doi:10.1137/S0097539701398521, MR 2001745.
