= Malcolm J. Williamson =

British mathematician and cryptographer (1950–2015)

- Born: 2 November 1950; Stockport, United Kingdom
- Died: 15 September 2015 (aged 64); San Diego, United States
- Known for: Independently developed a version of Diffie–Hellman key exchange
- Awards: IEEE Milestone, Cryptologic Hall of Honor
- Scientific career
- Fields: Cryptography

Malcolm John Williamson (2 November 1950 – 15 September 2015) was a British mathematician and cryptographer. In 1974 he developed what is now known as Diffie–Hellman key exchange. He was then working at GCHQ and was therefore unable to publicise his research as his work was classified. Martin Hellman, who independently developed the key exchange at the same time, received credit for the discovery until Williamson's research was declassified by the British government in 1997.

Williamson studied at Manchester Grammar School, winning first prize in the 1968 British Mathematical Olympiad. He also won a Silver prize at the 1967 International Mathematical Olympiad in Cetinje, Yugoslavia and a Gold prize at the 1968 International Mathematical Olympiad in Moscow. He read mathematics at Trinity College, Cambridge, graduating in 1971. After a year at Liverpool University, he joined GCHQ, and worked there until 1982.

From 1985 to 1989 Williamson worked at Nicolet Instruments in Madison, Wisconsin where he was the primary author on two digital hearing aid patents. After that, he moved to the IDA Center for Communications Research, La Jolla, where he worked for the rest of his career.

His contributions to the invention of public-key cryptography, together with Clifford Cocks and James Ellis, have been recognized by the IEEE Milestone Award #104 in 2010 and by induction into the Cryptologic Hall of Honor in 2021.

== See also ==
- James H. Ellis
- Clifford Cocks
