= Cocks IBE scheme =

Identity based encryption system

Cocks IBE scheme is an identity based encryption system proposed by Clifford Cocks in 2001. The security of the scheme is based on the hardness of the quadratic residuosity problem.

== Protocol ==
=== Setup ===
The PKG chooses:

1. a public RSA-modulus $\textstyle n = pq$, where $\textstyle p,q,\,p \equiv q \equiv 3 \bmod 4$ are prime and kept secret,
2. the message and the cipher space $\textstyle \mathcal{M} = \left\{-1,1\right\}, \mathcal{C} = \mathbb{Z}_n$ and
3. a secure public hash function $\textstyle f: \left\{0,1\right\}^* \rightarrow \mathbb{Z}_n$.

=== Extract ===
When user $\textstyle ID$ wants to obtain his private key, he contacts the PKG through a secure channel. The PKG

1. derives $\textstyle a$ with $\textstyle \left(\frac{a}{n}\right) = 1$ by a deterministic process from $\textstyle ID$ (e.g. multiple application of $\textstyle f$),
2. computes $\textstyle r = a^{(n+5-p-q)/8} \pmod n$ (which fulfils either $\textstyle r^2 = a \pmod n$ or $\textstyle r^2 = -a \pmod n$, see below) and
3. transmits $\textstyle r$ to the user.

=== Encrypt ===
To encrypt a bit (coded as $\textstyle 1$/$\textstyle -1$) $\textstyle m \in \mathcal{M}$ for $\textstyle ID$, the user

1. chooses random $\textstyle t_1$ with $\textstyle m = \left(\frac{t_1}{n}\right)$,
2. chooses random $\textstyle t_2$ with $\textstyle m = \left(\frac{t_2}{n}\right)$, different from $\textstyle t_1$,
3. computes $\textstyle c_1 = t_1 + at_1^{-1} \pmod n$ and $c_2= t_2 - at_2^{-1} \pmod n$ and
4. sends $\textstyle s=(c_1, c_2)$ to the user.

=== Decrypt ===
To decrypt a ciphertext $s=(c_1, c_2)$ for user $ID$, he

1. computes $\alpha = c_1 + 2r$ if $r^2=a$ or $\alpha = c_2 + 2r$ otherwise, and
2. computes $m = \left(\frac{\alpha}{n}\right)$.

Note that here we are assuming that the encrypting entity does not know whether $ID$ has the square root $r$ of $a$ or $-a$. In this case we have to send a ciphertext for both cases. As soon as this information is known to the encrypting entity, only one element needs to be sent.

=== Correctness ===
First note that since $\textstyle p \equiv q \equiv 3 \pmod 4$ (i.e. $\left(\frac{-1}{p}\right) = \left(\frac{-1}{q}\right) = -1$) and $\textstyle \left(\frac{a}{n}\right) \Rightarrow \left(\frac{a}{p}\right) = \left(\frac{a}{q}\right)$, either $\textstyle a$ or $\textstyle -a$ is a quadratic residue modulo $\textstyle n$.

Therefore, $\textstyle r$ is a square root of $\textstyle a$ or $\textstyle -a$:

$$\begin{align}
r^2 &\equiv \left(a^{(n+5-p-q)/8}\right)^2 \mod{n}\\
&\equiv \left(a^{(p*q+4+1-p-q)/8}\right)^2 \mod{n}\\
&\equiv \left(a^{((p-1)(q-1)+4)/8}\right)^2 \mod{n}\\
&\equiv \left(a^{0.5}*a^{((p-1)(q-1))/8}\right)^2 \mod{n}\\
&\equiv a*a^{(p-1)/2}*a^{(q-1)/2} \mod{n}\\
&\equiv \begin{cases}
a\mod{n} & |a\text{ is a quadratic residue}\mod{n} \\
-a\mod{n} & |-a\text{ is a quadratic residue}\mod{n}
\end{cases}
\end{align}$$

Where the last step is the result of a combination of Euler's Criterion and the Chinese remainder theorem.

Moreover, (for the case that $\textstyle a$ is a quadratic residue, same idea holds for $\textstyle -a$):

$$\begin{align}
\left(\frac{s+2r}{n}\right) &= \left(\frac{t + at^{-1} +2r}{n}\right) = \left(\frac{t\left(1+at^{-2} +2rt^{-1}\right)}{n}\right) \\
&= \left(\frac{t\left(1+r^2t^{-2} +2rt^{-1}\right)}{n}\right) = \left(\frac{t\left(1+rt^{-1}\right)^2}{n}\right) \\
&= \left(\frac{t}{n}\right) \left(\frac{1+rt^{-1}}{n}\right)^2 = \left(\frac{t}{n}\right)(\pm 1)^2 = \left(\frac{t}{n}\right)
\end{align}$$

== Security ==
It can be shown that breaking the scheme is equivalent to solving the quadratic residuosity problem, which is suspected to be very hard. The common rules for choosing an RSA modulus hold: Use a secure $\textstyle n$, make the choice of $\textstyle t$ uniform and random and moreover include some authenticity checks for $\textstyle t$ (otherwise, an adaptive chosen ciphertext attack can be mounted by altering packets that transmit a single bit and using the oracle to observe the effect on the decrypted bit).

== Problems ==
A major disadvantage of this scheme is that it can encrypt messages only bit per bit - therefore, it is only suitable for small data packets like a session key. To illustrate, consider a 128 bit key that is transmitted using a 1024 bit modulus. Then, one has to send 2 × 128 × 1024 bit = 32 KByte (when it is not known whether $r$ is the square of a or −a), which is only acceptable for environments in which session keys change infrequently.

This scheme does not preserve key-privacy, i.e. a passive adversary can recover meaningful information about the identity of the recipient observing the ciphertext.
