= James H. Ellis =

British engineer and cryptographer (1924–1997)

James Henry Ellis
- Born: 25 September 1924; Australia
- Died: 25 November 1997 (aged 73)
- Known for: Non-secret encryption
- Scientific career
- Fields: Cryptography
- Workplaces: GCHQ; Post Office Research Station

James Henry Ellis (25 September 1924 – 25 November 1997) was a British engineer and cryptographer. Born in Australia but raised and educated in Britain, Ellis joined GCHQ in 1952. He worked on a number of cryptographic projects, but is credited with some of the original thinking that developed into the field of Public Key Cryptography (PKC).

== Personal life ==
Ellis was born in Australia, but was raised in Britain and orphaned at an early age. He lived with his grandparents in London's East End. Ellis showed an early gift for mathematics and physics while attending grammar school in Leyton. He attended Imperial College London. In 1949, Ellis married Brenda, an artist and designer.

== Development of non-secret encryption ==
Ellis first proposed his scheme for "non-secret encryption" in 1970, in a (then) secret GCHQ internal report "The Possibility of Secure Non-Secret Digital Encryption". Ellis said that the idea first occurred to him after reading a paper from World War II by someone at Bell Labs describing the scheme named Project C43, a way to protect voice communications by the receiver adding (and then later subtracting) random noise.

Clifford Cocks and Malcom Williamson, two other GCHQ cryptographers, furthered Ellis' initial PKC related work. As all of this work prior to 1997 was classified, it never became part of very significant mainstream initiatives that developed into modern PKC commercial endeavors, such as the work on Diffie–Hellman key exchange, RSA and other PKC linked initiatives which have become part of the modern world of Internet security.

On 18 December 1997, Clifford Cocks delivered a public talk which contained a brief history of GCHQ's contribution to PKC. In March 2016, Robert Hannigan, the director of GCHQ made a speech at MIT re-emphasising GCHQ's early contribution to public-key cryptography and in particular the contributions of Ellis, Cocks and Williamson.
