= Certificate-based encryption =

Certificate-based encryption is a system in which a certificate authority uses ID-based cryptography to produce a certificate. This system gives the users both implicit and explicit certification, the certificate can be used as a conventional certificate (for signatures, etc.), but also implicitly for the purpose of encryption.

== Example ==
A user Alice can doubly encrypt a message using another user's (Bob) public key and his (Bob's) identity.

This means that the user (Bob) cannot decrypt it without a currently valid certificate and also that the certificate authority cannot decrypt the message as they don't have the user's private key (i.e., there is no implicit escrow as with ID-based cryptography, as the double encryption means they cannot decrypt it solely with the information they have). Certificate is the trust between two parties.

== Key revocation ==
Key revocation can be added to the system by requiring a new certificate to be issued as frequently as the level of security requires. Because the certificate is "public information", it does not need to be transmitted over a secret channel. The downside of this is the requirement for regular communication between users and the certificate authority, which means the certificate authority is more vulnerable to electronic attacks (such as denial-of-service attacks) and also that such attacks could effectively stop the system from working. This risk can be partially but not completely reduced by having a hierarchy of multiple certificate authorities.

== Practical applications ==
The best example of practical use of certificate-based encryption is Content Scramble System (CSS), which is used to encode DVD movies in such a way as to make them playable only in a part of the world where they are sold. However, the fact that the region decryption key is stored on the hardware level in the DVD players substantially weakens this form of protection.

== See also ==
- X.509
- Certificate server
