= Ralph Benjamin =

British scientist and electrical engineer (1922–2019)

- Born: 17 November 1922; Darmstadt, Germany
- Died: 7 May 2019 (aged 96)
- Known for: Roller ball (pointing device); Link 11
- Awards: CB (1980); FIET (1976); FCGI (1981); FREng (1983); FRSA (1984); Honorary DEng (2000); Achievement in Electronics Award (2006)
- Scientific career
- Fields: Electronic Engineering
- Workplaces: NATO; GCHQ; University College London

Ralph Benjamin CB FREng FIET FRSA (17 November 1922 – 7 May 2019) was a German-born British scientist and electrical engineer.

== Biography ==
Benjamin was born in Darmstadt, Germany. He attended boarding school in Switzerland from 1937, and was sent to England in 1939 as a refugee. He studied at Ellesmere College and at Imperial College London where he graduated with a 1st class honours in Electronic Engineering. He joined the Royal Naval Scientific Service in 1944, beginning his career at the Admiralty Surface Weapons Establishment (ASWE).

Benjamin invented the first trackball called roller ball in 1946, patented in 1947. Between 1947 and 1957 he developed the first force-wide integrated Command and Control System. This included patenting the use of an interlaced cursor controlled by a tracker ball to link displays to stored digital information, the first ever digital compression of video data, and the creation of the navy's first digital data link and network which is still in use NATO-wide as "Link 11".

== NATO ==
During the fifties and sixties he was a leading member of the national Advanced Computer Techniques Project and in 1961 he was acting international chairman NATO "Von Karman" studies on "Man and Machine" and "Command and Control".

From 1961 to 1964 he was Head of Research and Deputy Director, Admiralty Surface Weapons Establishment then in 1964 he became Chief Scientist Admiralty Underwater Weapons Establishment (AUWE), combined with Director, AUWE, and MoD Director Underwater Weapons R&D – posts he held until 1971. Original publications during this time resulted in a Doctorate of Science (DSc) and he published a textbook on "Modulation, Resolution and Signal processing" that was later unofficially translated into Russian. He also trained as a navy diver to better understand some of the challenges faced by the Royal Navy.

== GCHQ ==
In 1971 he became Chief Scientist, Chief Engineer and Superintending Director at GCHQ where he stayed until 1982. He was responsible for fast-track Research, Development, Procurement, and Deployment and use of equipment and techniques for Signals Intelligence. During most of this time he was also Chief Scientific Advisor to the Intelligence Services and national Co-ordinator Intelligence R&D.

At GCHQ, Benjamin played an important role in the original development of "non-secret cryptography", later independently discovered by Rivest, Shamir, and Adleman and termed public-key cryptography.

== Teaching ==
As a visiting professor at the University of Surrey between 1972 and 1978 he helped to start the Surrey University mini-satellite programme.

Following retirement from the civil service he became Head of Communications Techniques & Networks at the Supreme Headquarters Allied Powers Europe (SHAPE) Technical Centre from 1982 to 1987. Graduate NATO Staff College, 1983.

On his return to England he became a visiting Research Professor at University College, London, and since 1993, Bristol University. Until recently he was also a visiting professor at Imperial College, the Open University, and the Royal Military College of Science, and Member of Court at Brunel University. He also had substantial involvement in Defence Scientific Advisory Council, DSAC. He was given an honorary DEng by Bristol University in 2000. He has won the IET Heinrich Hertz premium twice, and also the Marconi premium and the Clarke Maxwell premium. In 2006 he was given the Achievement in Electronics Award and also in 2006 the Oliver Lodge Medal for IT.

His autobiography, called Five Lives in One, was published in 1996.

He died on 7 May 2019 at the age of 96.
