= Ciphertext expansion =

Length increase of a message when it is encrypted

In cryptography, the term ciphertext expansion refers to the length increase of a message when it is encrypted. Many modern cryptosystems cause some degree of expansion during the encryption process, for instance when the resulting ciphertext must include a message-unique Initialization Vector (IV). Probabilistic encryption schemes cause ciphertext expansion, as the set of possible ciphertexts is necessarily greater than the set of input plaintexts. Certain schemes, such as Cocks Identity Based Encryption, or the Goldwasser-Micali cryptosystem result in ciphertexts hundreds or thousands of times longer than the plaintext.

Ciphertext expansion may be offset or increased by other processes which compress or expand the message, e.g., data compression or error correction coding.

== Reasons why Ciphertext expansion can occur ==
=== Probabilistic Encryption ===
Probabilistic encryption schemes, such as the Goldwasser-Micali cryptosystem, necessarily produce ciphertexts that are longer than the original plaintexts. This is because the set of possible ciphertexts must be larger than the set of plaintexts to achieve semantic security.

=== Initialization Vectors (IVs) ===
Many block cipher modes of operation, like Cipher Block Chaining (CBC), require the use of an Initialization Vector (IV) that is unique for each message. The IV is typically appended to the ciphertext, resulting in expansion.

=== Redundancy and Error Correction ===
Some cryptographic schemes intentionally introduce redundancy or error correction codes into the ciphertext to protect against tampering or transmission errors. This added data increases the ciphertext size.

=== Specific Cryptosystems ===
Certain cryptographic schemes, such as Cocks Identity-Based Encryption, can produce ciphertexts that are hundreds or thousands of times longer than the original plaintext. This extreme expansion is a design choice to achieve the desired security properties.

Ciphertext expansion can be offset or increased by other processes that compress or expand the message, such as data compression or error correction coding. The overall impact on message size depends on the relative strengths of these competing effects.
