= Weil pairing =

Binary function non degenerative defined between the point of twist of an abelian variety

In mathematics, the Weil pairing is a pairing (bilinear form, though with multiplicative notation) on the points of order dividing n of an elliptic curve E, taking values in nth roots of unity. More generally there is a similar Weil pairing between points of order n of an abelian variety and its dual. It was introduced by André Weil (1940) for Jacobians of curves, who gave an abstract algebraic definition; the corresponding results for elliptic functions were known, and can be expressed simply by use of the Weierstrass sigma function.

== Formulation ==
Choose an elliptic curve E defined over a field K, and an integer n > 0 (we require n to be coprime to char(K) if char(K) > 0) such that K contains a primitive nth root of unity. Then the n-torsion on $E(\overline{K})$ is known to be a Cartesian product of two cyclic groups of order n. The Weil pairing produces an n-th root of unity

$$w(P,Q) \in \mu_n$$

by means of Kummer theory, for any two points $P,Q \in E(K)[n]$, where $E(K)[n]=\{T \in E(K) \mid n \cdot T = O \}$ and $\mu_n = \{x\in K \mid x^n =1 \}$.

A down-to-earth construction of the Weil pairing is as follows. Choose a function F in the function field of E over the algebraic closure of K with divisor

$$\mathrm{div}(F)= \sum_{0 \leq k < n}[P+k\cdot Q] - \sum_{0 \leq k < n} [k\cdot Q].$$

So F has a simple zero at each point P + kQ, and a simple pole at each point kQ if these points are all distinct. Then F is well-defined up to multiplication by a constant. If G is the translation of F by Q, then by construction G has the same divisor, so the function G/F is constant.

Therefore if we define

$$w(P,Q):=\frac{G}{F}$$

we shall have an n-th root of unity (as translating n times must give 1) other than 1. With this definition it can be shown that w is alternating and bilinear, giving rise to a non-degenerate pairing on the n-torsion.

The Weil pairing does not extend to a pairing on all the torsion points (the direct limit of n-torsion points) because the pairings for different n are not the same. However they do fit together to give a pairing T_{ℓ}(E) × T_{ℓ}(E) → T_{ℓ}(μ) on the Tate module T_{ℓ}(E) of the elliptic curve E (the inverse limit of the ℓ^{n}-torsion points) to the Tate module T_{ℓ}(μ) of the multiplicative group (the inverse limit of ℓ^{n} roots of unity).

== Generalisation to abelian varieties ==
For abelian varieties over an algebraically closed field K, the Weil pairing is a nondegenerate pairing

$$A[n] \times A^\vee[n] \longrightarrow \mu_n$$

for all n prime to the characteristic of K. Here $A^\vee$ denotes the dual abelian variety of A. This is the so-called Weil pairing for higher dimensions. If A is equipped with a polarisation

$$\lambda: A \longrightarrow A^\vee$$,

then composition gives a (possibly degenerate) pairing

$$A[n] \times A[n] \longrightarrow \mu_n.$$

If C is a projective, nonsingular curve of genus ≥ 0 over k, and J its Jacobian, then the theta-divisor of J induces a principal polarisation of J, which in this particular case happens to be an isomorphism (see autoduality of Jacobians). Hence, composing the Weil pairing for J with the polarisation gives a nondegenerate pairing

$$J[n]\times J[n] \longrightarrow \mu_n$$

for all n prime to the characteristic of k.

As in the case of elliptic curves, explicit formulae for this pairing can be given in terms of divisors of C.

== Applications ==
The pairing is used in number theory and algebraic geometry, and has also been applied in elliptic curve cryptography and identity based encryption.

== See also ==
- Tate pairing
- Pairing-based cryptography
- Boneh–Franklin scheme
- Homomorphic Signatures for Network Coding
