= Concrete security =

Cryptographic analysis

In cryptography, concrete security or exact security is a practice-oriented approach that aims to give more precise estimates of the computational power and time of the attackers tasks than asymptotic security would allow. It quantifies the security of a cryptosystem by bounding the probability of success for an adversary running for a fixed amount of time. Security proofs with precise analyses are referred to as concrete.

Traditionally, provable security is asymptotic: it classifies the hardness of computational problems using polynomial-time reducibility. Secure schemes are defined to be those in which the advantage of any computationally bounded adversary is negligible. While such a theoretical guarantee is important, in practice one needs to know exactly how efficient a reduction is because of the need to instantiate the security parameter - it is not enough to know that "sufficiently large" security parameters will do. An inefficient reduction results either in the success probability for the adversary or the resource requirement of the scheme being greater than desired.

Concrete security parametrizes all the resources available to the adversary, such as running time and memory, and other resources specific to the system in question, such as the number of plaintexts it can obtain or the number of queries it can make to any oracles available. Then the advantage of the adversary is upper bounded as a function of these resources and of the problem size. It is often possible to give a lower bound (i.e. an adversarial strategy) matching the upper bound, hence the name exact security.

== Examples ==
Concrete security estimates have been applied to cryptographic algorithms:

- In 1996, schemes for digital signatures based on the RSA and Rabin cryptosystems were proposed, which were shown to be approximately as difficult to break as the original cryptosystems.
- In 1997, some notions of concrete security (left-or-right indistinguishability, real-or-random indistinguishability, find-then-guess security, and semantic-security) for symmetric encryption algorithms were proved approximately equivalent in various block cipher modes of operation such as CBC, CTR, and XOR (a stateless variant of CBC).
- In 2017, a thesis showed that lattice point enumeration and lattice block reduction algorithms could be used to attack lattice-based cryptography.
- In 2021, "guess-and-determine" and "guess-and-decode"-type attacks were demonstrated against a proposed pseudorandom generator in NC0, where instances with parameter values previously claimed to have 128-bit security were solved in about $2^{78}$ operations.

In addition, a software tool named the "Foundational Cryptography Framework", which embeds into Rocq, is able to formally verify proofs of concrete security. For example, it is able to verify the concrete security of ElGamal encryption.
