= Seny Kamara =

American computer scientist

- Born: France
- Education: Purdue University; Johns Hopkins University
- Known for: Searchable symmetric encryption, structured encryption
- Scientific career
- Fields: Computer science, cryptography
- Workplaces: Brown University; Aroki Systems; Microsoft Research
- Doctoral advisor: Fabian Monrose
- Website: www.senykamara.com

Seny Kamara is a Senegalese-French-American computer scientist best known for his work on cryptography. He has delivered multiple congressional testimonies about the potential harms and opportunities with technology. He leads or co-leads numerous centers and activities focused on cryptography and social good. His work has been covered extensively in high-profile media, including Wired and Forbes.

== Education ==
Kamara received his bachelor's degree in Computer Science from Purdue University in 2001. He received his master's degree and PhD in Computer Science from Johns Hopkins University in 2008. His dissertation, "Computing Securely with Untrusted Resources", explored cryptographic problems in the setting of cloud computing including searchable symmetric encryption and proofs of storage.

== Career ==
Kamara is an associate professor of computer science at Brown University. He has worked as a chief scientist at Aroki Systems, as a principal scientist at MongoDB, and as a researcher at Microsoft Research. At Brown University, he co-directs the Encrypted Systems Lab and is affiliated with the CAPS group, the Data Science Initiative, the Center for Human Rights and Humanitarian Studies and the Policy Lab. He teaches a popular Algorithms for the People course that surveys, critiques, and aspires to address the ways in which computer science and technology affect marginalized communities.

== Research ==
Kamara is one of the principal contributors to the field of encrypted search and to searchable symmetric encryption (SSE). With Reza Curtmola, Juan Garay and Rafail Ostrovsky, he proposed the first SSE constructions to achieve optimal search time. Along with Melissa Chase, he later introduced structured encryption, which underlies most practical SSE and encrypted database schemes.

== Public work ==
Kamara gave congressional testimony to the U.S. House Committee on Space, Science, and Technology in 2021, where he argued for considering the harms technology can cause, and advocated for computer science and technology communities to work to mitigate those harms. Also in 2021, he collaborated with Senator Ron Wyden to advocate for an encrypted gun registry. In 2019, he delivered congressional testimony to the Financial Services Committee of the U.S. House of Representatives about how data uses in the financial industry have the potential to erode consumer privacy and increase discrimination. He joined a National Academy of Sciences committee focused on "Law Enforcement and Intelligence Access to Plaintext Information in an Era of Widespread Strong Encryption: Options and Tradeoffs", which produced a report on encryption and cybersecurity.

== Publications ==
Kamara's most cited publications are:

- Reza Curtmola, Juan Garay, Seny Kamara, Rafail Ostrovsky, Searchable symmetric encryption: improved definitions and efficient constructions (2011). Journal of Computer Security 19:895-934 (cited 2830 times, according to Google Scholar).
- Seny Kamara, Kristin Lauter, Cryptographic cloud storage (2010). International Conference on Financial Cryptography and Data Security, 136-149 (cited 1880 times, according to Google Scholar).
- Seny Kamara, Charalampos Papamanthou, Tom Roeder, Dynamic searchable symmetric encryption (2012). Proceedings of the 2012 ACM conference on Computer and communications (cited 1063 times, according to Google Scholar).
