= PRF advantage =

In cryptography, the pseudorandom-function advantage (PRF advantage) of an algorithm on a pseudorandom function family is a measure of how effectively the algorithm can distinguish between a member of the family and a random oracle. Consequently, the maximum pseudorandom advantage attainable by any algorithm with a fixed amount of computational resources is a measure of how well such a function family emulates a random oracle.

Say that an adversary algorithm has access to an oracle that will apply a function to inputs that are sent to it. The algorithm sends the oracle a number of queries before deciding whether the oracle is a random oracle or simply an instance of the pseudorandom function family. Say also that there is a 50% chance that the oracle is a random oracle and a 50% chance that it is a member of the function family. The pseudorandom advantage of the algorithm is defined as two times the probability that the algorithm guesses correctly minus one.
