= Key distribution =

Methods used to share cryptographic key material with other parties

In symmetric key cryptography, both parties must possess a secret key which they must exchange prior to using any encryption. Distribution of secret keys has been problematic until recently, because it involved face-to-face meeting, use of a trusted courier, or sending the key through an existing encryption channel. The first two are often impractical and unsafe, while the third depends on the security of a previous key exchange.

In public key cryptography, the key distribution of public keys is done through public key servers. When a person creates a key-pair, they keep one key private and the other, known as the public-key, is uploaded to a server where it can be accessed by anyone to send the user a private, encrypted, message.

Secure Sockets Layer (SSL) uses Diffie–Hellman key exchange if the client does not have a public-private key pair and a published certificate in the public key infrastructure, and Public Key Cryptography if the user does have both the keys and the credential.

Key distribution is an important issue in wireless sensor network (WSN) design. There are many key distribution schemes in the literature that are designed to maintain an easy and at the same time secure communication among sensor nodes. The most accepted method of key distribution in WSNs is key predistribution, where secret keys are placed in sensor nodes before deployment. When the nodes are deployed over the target area, the secret keys are used to create the network.

For more info see: key distribution in wireless sensor networks.

== Storage of keys in the cloud ==
Key distribution and key storage are more problematic in the cloud due to the transitory nature of the agents on it. Secret sharing can be used to store keys at many different servers on the cloud. In secret sharing, a secret is used as a seed to generate a number of distinct secrets, and the pieces are distributed so that some subset of the recipients can jointly authenticate themselves and use the secret information without learning what it is. But rather than store files on different servers, the key is parceled out and its secret shares stored at multiple locations in a manner that a subset of the shares can regenerate the key.

Secret sharing is used in cases where one wishes to distribute a secret among N shares so that M < N of them (M of N) can regenerate the original secret, but no smaller group up to M − 1 can do so.
