= Blom's scheme =

Cryptographic protocol

Blom's scheme is a symmetric threshold key exchange protocol in cryptography. The scheme was proposed by the Swedish cryptographer Rolf Blom in a series of articles in the early 1980s.

A trusted party gives each participant a secret key and a public identifier, which enables any two participants to independently create a shared key for communicating. However, if an attacker can compromise the keys of at least k users, they can break the scheme and reconstruct every shared key. Blom's scheme is a form of threshold secret sharing.

Blom's scheme is currently used by the HDCP (Version 1.x only) copy protection scheme to generate shared keys for high-definition content sources and receivers, such as HD DVD players and high-definition televisions.

== The protocol ==
The key exchange protocol involves a trusted party (Trent) and a group of $\scriptstyle n$ users. Let Alice and Bob be two users of the group.

=== Protocol setup ===
Trent chooses a random and secret symmetric matrix $\scriptstyle D_{k,k}$ over the finite field $\scriptstyle GF(p)$, where p is a prime number. $\scriptstyle D$ is required when a new user is to be added to the key sharing group.

For example:

$$\begin{align}
k &= 3\\
p &= 17\\
D &= \begin{pmatrix} 1&6&2\\6&3&8\\2&8&2\end{pmatrix}\ \mathrm{mod}\ 17
\end{align}$$

=== Inserting a new participant ===
New users Alice and Bob want to join the key exchanging group. Trent chooses public identifiers for each of them; i.e., k-element vectors:

$I_{\mathrm{Alice}}, I_{\mathrm{Bob}} \in GF^k(p)$.

For example:

$$I_{\mathrm{Alice}} = \begin{pmatrix} 1 \\ 2 \\ 3 \end{pmatrix}, I_{\mathrm{Bob}} = \begin{pmatrix} 5 \\ 3 \\ 1 \end{pmatrix}$$

Trent then computes their private keys:

$$\begin{align}
g_{\mathrm{Alice}} &= DI_{\mathrm{Alice}}\\
g_{\mathrm{Bob}} &= DI_{\mathrm{Bob}}
\end{align}$$

Using $D$ as described above:

$$\begin{align}
g_{\mathrm{Alice}} &= \begin{pmatrix} 1&6&2\\6&3&8\\2&8&2\end{pmatrix}\begin{pmatrix} 1 \\ 2 \\ 3 \end{pmatrix} = \begin{pmatrix} 19\\36\\24\end{pmatrix}\ \mathrm{mod}\ 17 = \begin{pmatrix} 2\\2\\7\end{pmatrix}\ \\
g_{\mathrm{Bob}} &= \begin{pmatrix} 1&6&2\\6&3&8\\2&8&2\end{pmatrix}\begin{pmatrix} 5 \\ 3 \\ 1 \end{pmatrix} = \begin{pmatrix} 25\\47\\36\end{pmatrix}\ \mathrm{mod}\ 17 = \begin{pmatrix} 8\\13\\2\end{pmatrix}\
\end{align}$$

Each will use their private key to compute shared keys with other participants of the group.

=== Computing a shared key between Alice and Bob ===
Now Alice and Bob wish to communicate with one another. Alice has Bob's identifier $\scriptstyle I_{\mathrm{Bob}}$ and her private key $\scriptstyle g_{\mathrm{Alice}}$.

She computes the shared key $\scriptstyle k_{\mathrm{Alice / Bob}} = g_{\mathrm{Alice}}^T I_{\mathrm{Bob}}$, where $\scriptstyle T$ denotes matrix transpose. Bob does the same, using his private key and her identifier, giving the same result:

$k_{\mathrm{Alice / Bob}} = k_{\mathrm{Alice / Bob}}^T = (g_{\mathrm{Alice}}^T I_{\mathrm{Bob}})^T = (I_{\mathrm{Alice}}^T D^T I_{\mathrm{Bob}})^T = I_{\mathrm{Bob}}^T D I_{\mathrm{Alice}} = k_{\mathrm{Bob / Alice}}$

They will each generate their shared key as follows:

$$\begin{align}
k_{\mathrm{Alice / Bob}} &= \begin{pmatrix} 2\\2\\7 \end{pmatrix}^T \begin{pmatrix} 5\\3\\1 \end{pmatrix} = 2 \times 5 + 2 \times 3 + 7 \times 1 = 23\ \mathrm{mod}\ 17 = 6\\
k_{\mathrm{Bob / Alice}} &= \begin{pmatrix} 8\\13\\2 \end{pmatrix}^T \begin{pmatrix} 1\\2\\3 \end{pmatrix} = 8 \times 1 + 13 \times 2 + 2 \times 3 = 40\ \mathrm{mod}\ 17 = 6
\end{align}$$

== Attack resistance ==
In order to ensure at least k keys must be compromised before every shared key can be computed by an attacker, identifiers must be k-linearly independent: all sets of k randomly selected user identifiers must be linearly independent. Otherwise, a group of malicious users can compute the key of any other member whose identifier is linearly dependent to theirs. To ensure this property, the identifiers shall be preferably chosen from a MDS-Code matrix (maximum distance separable error correction code matrix). The rows of the MDS-Matrix would be the identifiers of the users. A MDS-Code matrix can be chosen in practice using the code-matrix of the Reed–Solomon error correction code (this error correction code requires only easily understandable mathematics and can be computed extremely quickly).
