= Toeplitz Hash Algorithm =

Toeplitz Hash
General
- Related to: Receive Side Scaling

The Toeplitz Hash Algorithm describes hash functions that compute hash values through matrix multiplication of the key with a suitable Toeplitz matrix. The Toeplitz Hash Algorithm is used in many network interface controllers for receive side scaling.

As an example, with the Toeplitz matrix $T$ the key $k$ results in a hash $h$ as follows:

$$h = T\cdot k
= \begin{pmatrix}1 & 1 & 0 & 1 \\0 & 1 & 1 & 0 \\1 & 0 & 1 & 1 \\\end{pmatrix}
\cdot \begin{pmatrix}1\\1\\0\\0\\\end{pmatrix}
= \begin{pmatrix}0 \\1 \\1 \\\end{pmatrix}$$

where the entries are bits and all operations are modulo 2. In implementations the highly redundant matrix is not necessarily explicitly stored.
