= One-way function =

Function used in computer cryptography

Unsolved problem in computer science
Do one-way functions exist?
More unsolved problems in computer science

In computer science, a one-way function is a function that is easy to compute on every input, but hard to invert given the image of a random input. Here, "easy" and "hard" are to be understood in the sense of computational complexity theory, specifically the theory of polynomial time problems. This has nothing to do with whether the function is one-to-one; finding any one input with the desired image is considered a successful inversion. (See § Theoretical definition, below.)

The existence of such one-way functions is still an open conjecture. Their existence would prove that the complexity classes P and NP are not equal, thus resolving the foremost unsolved question of theoretical computer science. The converse is not known to be true, i.e. the existence of a proof that P ≠ NP would not directly imply the existence of one-way functions.

In applied contexts, the terms "easy" and "hard" are usually interpreted relative to some specific computing entity; typically "cheap enough for the legitimate users" and "prohibitively expensive for any malicious agents". One-way functions, in this sense, are fundamental tools for cryptography, personal identification, authentication, and other data security applications. While the existence of one-way functions in this sense is also an open conjecture, there are several candidates that have withstood decades of intense scrutiny. Some of them are essential ingredients of most telecommunications, e-commerce, and e-banking systems around the world.

== Theoretical definition ==
A function f : {0, 1}^{*} → {0, 1}^{*} is one-way if f can be computed by a polynomial-time algorithm, but any polynomial-time randomized algorithm $F$ that attempts to compute a pseudo-inverse for f succeeds with negligible probability. (The * superscript means any number of repetitions, see Kleene star.) That is, for all randomized algorithms $F$, all positive integers c and all sufficiently large n = length(x),

$$\Pr[f(F(f(x))) = f(x)] < n^{-c},$$

where the probability is over the choice of x from the discrete uniform distribution on {0, 1} ^{n}, and the randomness of $F$.

Note that, by this definition, the function must be "hard to invert" in the average-case, rather than worst-case sense. This is different from much of complexity theory (e.g., NP-hardness), where the term "hard" is meant in the worst-case. That is why even if some candidates for one-way functions (described below) are known to be NP-complete, it does not imply their one-wayness. The latter property is only based on the lack of known algorithms to solve the problem.

It is not sufficient to make a function "lossy" (not one-to-one) to have a one-way function. In particular, the function that outputs the string of n zeros on any input of length n is not a one-way function because it is easy to come up with an input that will result in the same output. More precisely: For such a function that simply outputs a string of zeroes, an algorithm F that just outputs any string of length n on input f(x) will "find" a proper preimage of the output, even if it is not the input which was originally used to find the output string.

== Related concepts ==
A one-way permutation is a one-way function that is also a permutation—that is, a one-way function that is bijective. One-way permutations are an important cryptographic primitive, and it is not known if their existence is implied by the existence of one-way functions.

A trapdoor one-way function or trapdoor permutation is a special kind of one-way function. Such a function is hard to invert unless some secret information, called the trapdoor, is known.

A collision-free hash function f is a one-way function that is also collision-resistant; that is, no randomized polynomial time algorithm can find a collision—distinct values x, y such that f(x) = f(y)—with non-negligible probability.

A hard-core predicate of a one-way function f is a predicate (i.e. single bit) b such that b(x) is easy to compute given x but hard to compute given only f(x).

== Theoretical implications of one-way functions ==
If f is a one-way function, then the inversion of f would be a problem whose output is hard to compute (by definition) but easy to check (just by computing f on it). Thus, the existence of a one-way function implies that FP ≠ FNP, which in turn implies that P ≠ NP. However, P ≠ NP does not imply the existence of one-way functions.

The existence of a one-way function implies the existence of many other useful concepts, including:

- Pseudorandom generators
- Pseudorandom function families
- Bit commitment schemes
- Private-key encryption schemes secure against adaptive chosen-ciphertext attack
- Message authentication codes
- Digital signature schemes (secure against adaptive chosen-message attack)

== Candidates for one-way functions ==
The following are several candidates for one-way functions (as of April 2009). Clearly, it is not known whether these functions are indeed one-way; but extensive research has so far failed to produce an efficient inverting algorithm for any of them.

=== Multiplication and factoring ===
The function f takes as inputs two prime numbers p and q in binary notation and returns their product. This function can be "easily" computed in O(b^{2}) time, where b is the total number of bits of the inputs. Inverting this function requires finding the factors of a given integer N. The best factoring algorithms known run in $O\left(\exp\sqrt[3]{\frac{64}{9} b (\log b)^2}\right)$time, where b is the number of bits needed to represent N.

This function can be generalized by allowing p and q to range over a suitable set of semiprimes. Note that f is not one-way for randomly selected integers p, q > 1, since the product will have 2 as a factor with probability 3/4 (because the probability that an arbitrary p is odd is 1/2, and likewise for q, so if they're chosen independently, the probability that both are odd is therefore 1/4; hence the probability that p or q is even, is 1 − 1/4 = 3/4).

=== The Rabin function (modular squaring) ===
The Rabin function, or squaring modulo $N=pq$, where p and q are primes is believed to be a collection of one-way functions. We write

$$\operatorname{Rabin}_N(x)\triangleq x^2\bmod N$$

to denote squaring modulo N: a specific member of the Rabin collection. It can be shown that extracting square roots, i.e. inverting the Rabin function, is computationally equivalent to factoring N (in the sense of polynomial-time reduction). Hence it can be proven that the Rabin collection is one-way if and only if factoring is hard. This also holds for the special case in which p and q are of the same bit length. The Rabin signature algorithm is based on the assumption that this Rabin function is one-way.

=== Discrete exponential and logarithm ===
Modular exponentiation can be done in polynomial time. Inverting this function requires computing the discrete logarithm. Currently there are several popular groups for which no algorithm to calculate the underlying discrete logarithm in polynomial time is known. These groups are all finite abelian groups and the general discrete logarithm problem can be described as thus.

Let G be a finite abelian group of cardinality n. Denote its group operation by multiplication. Consider a primitive element α ∈ G and another element β ∈ G. The discrete logarithm problem is to find the positive integer k, where 1 ≤ k ≤ n, such that:

$$\alpha^k = \underbrace{\alpha \cdot \alpha \cdot \ldots \cdot \alpha}_{k \; \mathrm{times}} = \beta$$

The integer k that solves the equation α^{k} = β is termed the discrete logarithm of β to the base α. One writes k = log_{α} β.

Popular choices for the group G in discrete logarithm cryptography are the cyclic groups (Z_{p})^{×} (e.g. ElGamal encryption, Diffie–Hellman key exchange, and the Digital Signature Algorithm) and cyclic subgroups of elliptic curves over finite fields (see elliptic curve cryptography).

An elliptic curve is a set of pairs of elements of a field satisfying y^{2} = x^{3} + ax + b. The elements of the curve form a group under an operation called "point addition" (which is not the same as the addition operation of the field). Multiplication kP of a point P by an integer k (i.e., a group action of the additive group of the integers) is defined as repeated addition of the point to itself. If k and P are known, it is easy to compute R = kP, but if only R and P are known, it is assumed to be hard to compute k.

=== Cryptographically secure hash functions ===
There are a number of cryptographic hash functions that are fast to compute, such as SHA-256. Some of the simpler versions have fallen to sophisticated analysis, but the strongest versions continue to offer fast, practical solutions for one-way computation. Most of the theoretical support for the functions are more techniques for thwarting some of the previously successful attacks.

=== Other candidates ===
Other candidates for one-way functions include the hardness of the decoding of random linear codes, the hardness of certain lattice problems, and the subset sum problem (Naccache–Stern knapsack cryptosystem).

== Universal one-way function ==
There is an explicit function f that has been proved to be one-way, if and only if one-way functions exist. In other words, if any function is one-way, then so is f. Since this function was the first combinatorial complete one-way function to be demonstrated, it is known as the "universal one-way function". The problem of finding a one-way function is thus reduced to proving—perhaps non-constructively—that one such function exists.

There also exists a function that is one-way if polynomial-time bounded Kolmogorov complexity is mildly hard on average. Since the existence of one-way functions implies that polynomial-time bounded Kolmogorov complexity is mildly hard on average, the function is a universal one-way function.

== Quantum one-way functions ==
Post-quantum one-way functions are classical functions whose inversion is assumed to remain computationally hard even for quantum computers.Quantum one-way functions (QOWFs), and related quantum cryptographic primitives, instead produce quantum states as outputs. A typical QOWF efficiently maps of a classical input to a quantum state. As in the classical setting, the mapping is easy to compute but intended to be difficult to invert. Depending on the construction, this hardness may arise from computational assumptions or directly from the laws of quantum mechanics, such as the Holevo bound, the no-cloning theorem, and the impossibility of perfectly distinguishing non-orthogonal quantum states. Consequently, some QOWFs provide information-theoretic security, provided that only a bounded number of copies of the output state are available. QOWFs have been proposed as building blocks for quantum public-key cryptography, quantum digital signatures, quantum money, and other quantum cryptographic protocols.

== See also ==
- One-way compression function
- Cryptographic hash function
- Geometric cryptography
- Trapdoor function
