= CECPQ1 =

Experimental post-quantum key exchange developed by Google

In cryptography, CECPQ1 (combined elliptic-curve and post-quantum 1) is a post-quantum key-agreement protocol developed by Google as a limited experiment for use in Transport Layer Security (TLS) by web browsers. It was succeeded by CECPQ2.

== Details ==
CECPQ1 was designed to test algorithms that can provide confidentiality even against an attacker who possesses a large quantum computer. It is a key-agreement algorithm for TLS that combines X25519 and NewHope, a ring learning with errors primitive. Even if NewHope were to turn out to be compromised, the parallel X25519 key-agreement ensures that CECPQ1 provides at least the security of existing connections.

It was available in Google Chrome 54 beta. In 2016, its experimental use in Chrome ended and it was planned to be disabled in a later Chrome update.

It was succeeded by CECPQ2.

== See also ==
- Elliptic-curve Diffie–Hellman (ECDH) – an anonymous key agreement protocol
