= GGH =

GGH may refer to:

- Gamma-glutamyl hydrolase
- Gartnavel General Hospital in Glasgow, Scotland
- GGH encryption scheme, an asymmetric lattice-based cryptosystem
- GGH signature scheme, a digital signature schemes
- Greater Golden Horseshoe, Ontario, Canada
- Ground glass hepatocyte
- Guelph General Hospital in Ontario, Canada
