= Lattice-based cryptography =

Cryptographic primitives that involve lattices

Lattice-based cryptography is the generic term for constructions of cryptographic primitives that involve lattices, either in the construction itself or in the security proof. Lattice-based constructions support important standards of post-quantum cryptography. Unlike more widely used and known public-key schemes such as the RSA, Diffie-Hellman or elliptic-curve cryptosystems—which could, theoretically, be defeated using Shor's algorithm on a quantum computer—some lattice-based constructions appear to be resistant to attack by both classical and quantum computers. Furthermore, many lattice-based constructions are considered to be secure under the assumption that certain well-studied computational lattice problems cannot be solved efficiently.

In 2024 NIST announced the Module-Lattice-Based Digital Signature Standard for post-quantum cryptography.

== History ==
In 1996, Miklós Ajtai introduced the first lattice-based cryptographic construction whose security could be based on the hardness of well-studied lattice problems, and Cynthia Dwork showed that a certain average-case lattice problem, known as short integer solutions (SIS), is at least as hard to solve as a worst-case lattice problem. She then showed a cryptographic hash function whose security is equivalent to the computational hardness of SIS.

In 1998, Jeffrey Hoffstein, Jill Pipher, and Joseph H. Silverman introduced a lattice-based public-key encryption scheme, known as NTRU. However, their scheme is not known to be at least as hard as solving a worst-case lattice problem.

The first lattice-based public-key encryption scheme whose security was proven under worst-case hardness assumptions was introduced by Oded Regev in 2005, together with the learning with errors problem (LWE). Since then, much follow-up work has focused on improving Regev's security proof and improving the efficiency of the original scheme. Much more work has been devoted to constructing additional cryptographic primitives based on LWE and related problems. For example, in 2009, Craig Gentry introduced the first fully homomorphic encryption scheme, which was based on a lattice problem.

== Mathematical background ==
In linear algebra, a lattice $L \subset \mathbb{R}^n$ is the set of all integer linear combinations of vectors from a basis $\{\mathbf{b}_1, \ldots, \mathbf{b}_n\}$ of $\mathbb{R}^n$. In other words, $L = \Big\{ \sum a_i \mathbf{b}_i : a_i \in \mathbb{Z} \Big\}.$ For example, $\mathbb{Z}^n$ is a lattice, generated by the standard basis for $\mathbb{R}^n$. Crucially, the basis for a lattice is not unique. For example, the vectors $(3, 1, 4)$, $(1, 5, 9)$, and $(2, -1, 0)$ form an alternative basis for $\mathbb{Z}^3$.

The most important lattice-based computational problem is the shortest vector problem (SVP or sometimes GapSVP), which asks for an approximate minimal Euclidean length of a non-zero lattice vector. This problem is thought to be hard to solve efficiently, even with approximation factors that are polynomial in $n$, and even with a quantum computer. Many (though not all) lattice-based cryptographic constructions are known to be secure if SVP is in fact hard in this regime.

== Selected lattice-based schemes ==
This section presents selected lattice-based schemes, grouped by primitive.

=== Encryption ===
Selected schemes for the purpose of encryption:

- GGH encryption scheme, which is based in the closest vector problem (CVP). In 1999, Nguyen published a critical flaw in the scheme's design.
- NTRUEncrypt.

=== Homomorphic encryption ===
Selected schemes for the purpose of homomorphic encryption:

- Gentry's original scheme.
- Brakerski and Vaikuntanathan.

=== Hash functions ===
Selected lattice-based cryptographic schemes for the purpose of hashing:

- SWIFFT.
- Lattice Based Hash Function (LASH).

=== Key exchange ===
Selected schemes for the purpose of key exchange, also called key establishment, key encapsulation and key encapsulation mechanism (KEM):

- CRYSTALS-Kyber, which is built upon module learning with errors (module-LWE). Kyber was selected for standardization by the NIST in 2023. In August 2023, NIST published FIPS 203 (Initial Public Draft), and started referring to their Kyber version as Module-Lattice-based Key Encapsulation Mechanism (ML-KEM).
- FrodoKEM, a scheme based on the learning with errors (LWE) problem. FrodoKEM joined the standardization call conducted by the National Institute of Standards and Technology (NIST), and lived up to the 3rd round of the process. It was then discarded due to low performance reasons. In October 2022, the Twitter account associated to cryptologist Daniel J. Bernstein posted security issues in frodokem640.
- NewHope is based on the ring learning with errors (RLWE) problem.
- NTRU Prime.
- Peikert's work, which is based on the ring learning with errors (RLWE) problem.
- Saber, which is based on the module learning with rounding (module-LWR) problem.

=== Signing ===
This section lists a selection of lattice-based schemes for the purpose of digital signatures.

- CRYSTALS-Dilithium, which is built upon module learning with errors (module-LWE) and module short integer solution (module-SIS). Dilithium was selected for standardization by the NIST. According to a message from Ray Perlner, writing on behalf of the NIST PQC team, the NIST module-LWE signing standard is to be based on version 3.1 of the Dilithium specification.
- Falcon, which is built upon short integer solution (SIS) over NTRU. Falcon was selected for standardization by the NIST.
- GGH signature scheme.
- Güneysu, Lyubashevsky, and Pöppelmann's work, which is based on ring learning with errors (RLWE).
- Falcon, based on NTRU lattices; used by Algorand for its state proofs.
- MITAKA, a variant of Falcon.
- NTRUSign.
- qTESLA, which is based on ring learning with errors (RLWE). The qTESLA scheme joined the standardization call conducted by the National Institute of Standards and Technology (NIST).

==== CRYSTALS-Dilithium ====
CRYSTALS-Dilithium or simply Dilithium is built upon module-LWE and module-SIS. Dilithium was selected by the NIST as the basis for a digital signature standard. According to a message from Ray Perlner, writing on behalf of the NIST PQC team, the NIST module-LWE signing standard is to be based on version 3.1 of the Dilithium specification. NIST's changes on Dilithium 3.1 intend to support additional randomness in signing (hedged signing) and other improvements.

Dilithium was one of the two digital signature schemes initially chosen by the NIST in their post-quantum cryptography process, the other one being SPHINCS+, which is not based on lattices but on hashes.

In August 2023, NIST published FIPS 204 (Initial Public Draft), and started calling Dilithium "Module-Lattice-Based Digital Signature Algorithm" (ML-DSA).

As of October 2023, ML-DSA was being implemented as a part of Libgcrypt, according to Falko Strenzke.

In August 2024, NIST officially standardized CRYSTALS-Dilithium under the name ML-DSA, establishing it as the primary standard (FIPS 204) for quantum-resistant digital signatures.

== Security ==
Lattice-based cryptographic constructions hold a great promise for public-key post-quantum cryptography. Indeed, the main alternative forms of public-key cryptography are schemes based on the hardness of factoring, the discrete logarithm, and related problems such as RSA and Diffie–Hellman. However, both factoring and the discrete logarithm problem are known to be solvable in polynomial time on a quantum computer. Furthermore, algorithms for factorization tend to yield algorithms for discrete logarithm, and conversely. This further motivates the study of constructions based on alternative assumptions, such as the hardness of lattice problems.

Many lattice-based cryptographic schemes are known to be secure assuming the worst-case hardness of certain lattice problems. I.e., if there exists an algorithm that can efficiently break the cryptographic scheme with non-negligible probability, then there exists an efficient algorithm that solves a certain lattice problem on any input. However, for the practical lattice-based constructions (such as schemes based on NTRU and even schemes based on LWE with efficient parameters), meaningful reduction-based guarantees of security are not known.

Assessments of the security levels provided by reduction arguments from hard problems—based on recommended parameter sizes, standard estimates of the computational complexity of the hard problems, and detailed examination of the steps in the reductions—are called concrete security and sometimes practice-oriented provable security. Some authors who have investigated concrete security for lattice-based cryptosystems have found that the provable security results for such systems do not provide any meaningful concrete security for practical values of the parameters.

== Functionality ==
For many cryptographic primitives, the only known constructions are based on lattices or closely related objects. These primitives include fully homomorphic encryption, indistinguishability obfuscation, cryptographic multilinear maps, and functional encryption.

== See also ==
- Lattice problems
- Learning with errors
- Homomorphic encryption
- Post-quantum cryptography
- Ring learning with errors
- Ring learning with Errors Key Exchange
