= RLWE =

RLWE may refer to:

- Regularized long-wave equation; see Benjamin–Bona–Mahony equation
- Ring learning with errors
- Radio Limerick Weekly Echo, popular radio station broadcasting in Limerick, Ireland in 1978-1979
