= Rebecca Krauthamer =

Rebecca Krauthamer is an American technology entrepreneur in quantum computing. She was named to Forbes' "30 Under 30" list in 2020.

== Education ==
Krauthamer graduated from Stanford University in 2013 with a Bachelor of Science in Symbolic Systems, an interdisciplinary program combining computer science, cognitive science, linguistics and philosophy. Her studies focused on artificial intelligence.

== Career ==
After working in artificial intelligence and machine learning, Krauthamer became interested in quantum computing and its potential applications. She subsequently co-founded Quantum Thought, a venture studio focused on quantum-computing applications. Her work later shifted toward the cybersecurity implications of quantum computing, including the threat that quantum computers could pose to public-key cryptography.

In December 2019, she was included in Forbes' "30 Under 30" list in the Science category.

In 2019 Krauthamer co-founded QuSecure, a cybersecurity company focused on post-quantum cryptography. She initially served as vice president of engineering and later as chief product officer, overseeing development of the company's post-quantum cryptography technology..

In February 2025, Krauthamer was appointed chief executive officer as the company announced an expansion of its Series A financing to $28 million. In 2020, QuSecure received an initial Phase I Small Business Innovation Research award from the United States Air Force to develop a quantum-security management system for protecting command-and-control infrastructure against emerging quantum-computing threats.

== Public activities ==
Krauthamer served on the World Economic Forum's Global Futures Council on Quantum Computing from 2020 to 2024. She also participated in the Forum's work on quantum-computing governance and cybersecurity, contributing to the reports ''Quantum Computing Governance Principles'' and ''Transitioning to a Quantum-Secure Economy''. In June 2026, QuSecure was named a World Economic Forum Technology Pioneer.

Krauthamer has also worked on the ethics of emerging technologies. She served on the advisory board of the AI Ethics Journal and as a subject-matter expert for Coursera's Certified Ethical Emerging Technologist program.

In 2026, Krauthamer was included in Inc. Female Founders 500 list. In September 2026, she participated in a panel at Fast Company's Innovation Festival "Quantum's Big Promise—and Its Big Risk".
