= Parity learning =

Parity learning is a problem in machine learning. An algorithm that solves this problem must find a function ƒ, given some samples (x, ƒ(x)) and the assurance that ƒ computes the parity of bits at some fixed locations. The samples are generated using some distribution over the input. The problem is easy to solve using Gaussian elimination provided that a sufficient number of samples (from a distribution which is not too skewed) are provided to the algorithm.

== Noisy version ("Learning Parity with Noise") ==
In Learning Parity with Noise (LPN), the samples may contain some error. Instead of samples (x, ƒ(x)), the algorithm is provided with (x, y), where for random boolean $b \in \{0,1\}$

$$y = \begin{cases} f(x), & \text{if }b \\ 1-f(x), & \text{otherwise} \end{cases}$$

The noisy version of the parity learning problem is conjectured to be hard and is widely used in cryptography.

== See also ==
- Learning with errors
