= SWIFFT =

Cryptographic hash function

General
- Designers: Vadim Lyubashevsky, Daniele Micciancio, Chris Peikert, Alon Rosen
- First published: 2008
- Related to: FFT-based algorithms

In cryptography, SWIFFT is a collection of provably secure hash functions. It is based on the concept of the fast Fourier transform (FFT). SWIFFT is not the first hash function based on the FFT, but it sets itself apart by providing a mathematical proof of its security. It can be shown that finding collisions in SWIFFT is at least as difficult as finding short vectors in cyclic/ideal lattices in the worst case. By giving a security reduction to the worst case of a difficult mathematical problem, SWIFFT gives a much stronger security guarantee than most other cryptographic hash functions.

Unlike many other provably secure hash functions, the algorithm is quite fast, yielding a throughput of 40 Mbit/s on a 3.2 GHz Intel Pentium 4. Although SWIFFT satisfies many desirable cryptographic and statistical properties, it was not designed to be an "all-purpose" cryptographic hash function. For example, it is not a pseudorandom function, and would not be a suitable instantiation of a random oracle. The algorithm is less efficient than most traditional hash functions that do not give a proof of their collision-resistance. Therefore, its practical use would lie mostly in applications where the proof of collision-resistance is particularly valuable, such as digital signatures that must remain trustworthy for a long time.

A modification of SWIFFT called SWIFFTX was proposed as a candidate for SHA-3 function to the NIST hash function competition and was rejected in the first round.

== The algorithm ==
The algorithm is as follows:

1. Let the polynomial variable be called α.
2. Input: message M of length mn
3. Convert M to a collection of polynomials p_{1}, …, p_{m} in a certain polynomial ring R with binary coefficients.
4. Compute the Fourier coefficients of each p_{i} using SWIFFT.
5. Define the Fourier coefficients of a_{i}, so that they are fixed and depend on a family of SWIFFT.
6. Point-wise multiply the Fourier coefficients p_{i} with the Fourier coefficients of a_{i} for each i.
7. Use inverse FFT to obtain m polynomials f_{i} of degree < 2n.
8. Compute $f = \sum_{i=1}^m (f_i)$ modulo p and α^{n} + 1.
9. Convert f to n log(p) bits and output it.

The FFT operation in step 4 is easy to invert, and is performed to achieve diffusion, that is, to mix the input bits. The linear combination in step 6 achieves confusion, since it compresses the input. This is just a high level description of what the algorithm does, some more advanced optimizations are used to finally yield a high performing algorithm.

=== Example ===
Assuming the parameters (n, m, p) = (64, 16, 257), any fixed compression function in the family takes a binary input of length mn = 1024 bits (128 bytes) to an output in the range ℤ^{n}_{p}, which has size p^{n} = 257^{64}. An output in ℤ^{n}_{p} can easily be represented using 528 bits (66 bytes).

== Algebraic description ==
The SWIFFT functions can be described as a simple algebraic expression over some polynomial ring R. A family of these functions depends on three main parameters: let n be a power of 2, let m > 0 be a small integer, and let p > 0 be a modulus (not necessarily prime, but is convenient to choose it prime). Define R to be the ring R = ℤ_{p}[α]/(α^{n} + 1), i.e., the ring of polynomials in α having integer coefficients, modulo p and α^{n} + 1. An element of R can be written as a polynomial of degree < n having coefficients in ℤ_{p}. A certain function in the SWIFFT family is specified by m fixed elements a_{1}, …, a_{m} ∈ R of the ring $R$, that are called multipliers. The function corresponds to the following formula over R:

$$\sum_{i=1}^m (a_i \cdot x_i)$$

The x_{1}, …, x_{m} ∈ R are polynomials with binary coefficients, and corresponding to the binary input of length mn.

== Computing the polynomial product ==
To compute the above expression, the main problem is to compute the polynomial products a_{i} ⋅ x_{i}. A fast way to compute these products is given by the convolution theorem. This says that under certain restrictions, F {f ∗ g} = F {f} ⋅ F {g}, where F denotes the Fourier transform and ⋅ denotes the pointwise product. In the general case of the convolution theorem, ∗ does not denote multiplication but convolution. It can, however, be shown that polynomial multiplication is a convolution.

=== Fast Fourier transform ===
The fast Fourier transform is used to find the Fourier coefficients of each polynomial, which are then multiplied point-wise with the respective Fourier coefficients of the other polynomial. The resulting coefficients are then transformed to a polynomial of degree < 2n using an inverse fast Fourier transform.

=== Number-theoretic transform ===
Instead of the normal Fourier transform, SWIFFT uses the number-theoretic transform. The number-theoretic transform uses roots of unity in ℤ_{p} instead of complex roots of unity. In order for this to work, ℤ_{p} needs to be a finite field and primitive 2n^{th} roots of unity need to exist in this field. This can be done by taking p prime such that 2n divides p − 1.

== Parameter choice ==
The parameters m, p, and n are subject to the following restrictions:

- n must be a power of 2,
- p must be prime,
- p − 1 must be a multiple of 2n, and
- log(p) < m (otherwise the output will not be smaller than the input).

A possible choice is (n,m,p) = (64,16,257), which achieves a throughput of about 40 Mbit/s, security of about 2^{106} operations for finding collisions, and a digest size of 512 bits.

== Statistical properties ==
- Universal hashing. The SWIFFT family of functions is universal. This means that for any fixed distinct x and y, the probability (over the random choice of f from the family) that f(x) = f(y) is the inverse of the size of the range.
- Regularity. The SWIFFT family of compression functions is regular. A function f is said to be regular if, for an input x chosen uniformly at random from the domain, the output f(x) is distributed uniformly over the range.
- Randomness extractor. SWIFFT is a randomness extractor. For hash tables and related applications, it is usually desirable for the outputs of the hash function to be distributed uniformly (or as close to uniformly as possible), even when the inputs are not uniform. Hash functions that give such guarantees are known as randomness extractors, because they distill the non-uniform randomness of the input down to an (almost) uniformly distributed output. Formally, randomness extraction is actually a property of a family of functions, from which one function is chosen at random (and obliviously to the input).

== Cryptographic properties and security ==
- SWIFFT is not pseudorandom, due to linearity. For any function f from our family and any two inputs x and y such that x + y is also a valid input, we have that f(x) + f(y) = f(x + y). This relation is very unlikely to hold for a random function, so an adversary can easily distinguish our functions from a random function.
- It is not claimed by the authors that SWIFFT functions behave like a random oracle. A function is said to behave like a random oracle if it acts like a truly random function. This differs from pseudorandomness in that the function is fixed and public.
- The SWIFFT family is provably collision resistant (in an asymptotic sense), under a relatively mild assumption about the worst-case difficulty of finding short vectors in cyclic/ideal lattices. This implies that the family is also second preimage resistant.

=== Theoretical security ===
SWIFFT is an example of a provably secure cryptographic hash function. As with most security proofs, the security proof of SWIFFT relies on a reduction to a certain difficult-to-solve mathematical problem. Note that this means that the security of SWIFFT relies strongly on the difficulty of this mathematical problem.

The reduction in the case of SWIFFT is to the problem of finding short vectors in cyclic/ideal lattices. It can be proven that the following holds: Suppose we have an algorithm that, for a random version of SWIFFT given by f, can find collisions in f within some feasible time T, and with probability p. It is allowed that the algorithm only works in a small but noticeable fraction of the SWIFFT family. Then we can find also an algorithm f_{2} which can always find a short vector in any ideal lattice over the ring ℤ_{p}[α]/(α^{n} + 1) in some feasible time T_{2}, depending on T and p. This means that finding collisions in SWIFFT is at least as difficult as the worst case of finding short vectors in a lattice over ℤ_{p}[α]/(α^{n} + 1). At the moment, the fastest algorithms for finding short vectors are all exponential in n. Note that this ensures that there is no significant set of "weak instances" where the security of SWIFFT is weak. This guarantee is not given by most other provably secure hash functions.

=== Practical security ===
Known working attacks are the generalized birthday attack, which takes 2^{106} operations, and inversion attacks which takes 2^{448} operations for a standard parameter choice. This is usually considered to be enough to render an attack by an adversary infeasible.
