= GGH signature scheme =

Digital signature scheme

The Goldreich-Goldwasser-Halevi (GGH) signature scheme is a digital signature scheme proposed in 1995 and published in 1997, based on solving the closest vector problem (CVP) in a lattice. The signer demonstrates knowledge of a good basis for the lattice by using it to solve CVP on a point representing the message; the verifier uses a bad basis for the same lattice to verify that the signature under consideration is actually a lattice point and is sufficiently close to the message point.

The idea was not developed in detail in the original paper, which focussed more on the associated encryption algorithm.

GGH signatures form the basis for the NTRUSign signature algorithm.

Phong Q. Nguyen and Oded Regev had cryptanalyzed (broken) the original GGH signature scheme in 2006.

== Bibliography ==
- Goldreich, Oded; Goldwasser, Shafi; Halevi, Shai (1997). "Public-key cryptosystems from lattice reduction problems". CRYPTO '97: Proceedings of the 17th Annual International Cryptology Conference on Advances in Cryptology. London: Springer-Verlag. pp. 112–131.
- Nguyen, Phong Q.; Regev, Oded (11 November 2008). "Learning a Parallelepiped: Cryptanalysis of GGH and NTRU Signatures" (PDF). Journal of Cryptology. 22 (2): 139–160. doi:10.1007/s00145-008-9031-0. eISSN 1432-1378. ISSN 0933-2790. S2CID 2164840.Preliminary version in EUROCRYPT 2006.
