= Oded Regev (computer scientist) =

Israeli-American computer scientist

- עודד רגב
- Education: Tel Aviv University
- Known for: Learning with errors
- Awards: RSA Award for Excellence in Mathematics (2024); Silver Professorships (2022); Simons Investigator (2019); Gödel Prize (2018); Krill Prize (2005)
- Scientific career
- Fields: Computer science, Lattice-based cryptography
- Workplaces: Courant Institute of Mathematical Sciences
- Thesis: Scheduling and Load Balancing (2001)
- Doctoral advisor: Yossi Azar
- Website: cims.nyu.edu/~regev/

Oded Regev (Hebrew: עודד רגב; born 1978) is an Israeli-American theoretical computer scientist and mathematician. He is a professor of computer science at the Courant institute at New York University. He is best known for his work in lattice-based cryptography, and in particular for introducing the learning with errors problem.

== Biography ==
Oded Regev earned his B.Sc. in 1995, M.Sc. in 1997, and Ph.D. in 2001, all from Tel Aviv University. He completed his Ph.D. at the age of 21, advised by Yossi Azar, with a thesis titled "Scheduling and Load Balancing." He held faculty positions at Tel Aviv University and the École Normale Supérieure before joining the Courant institute.

== Work ==
Regev has done extensive work on lattices. He is best known for introducing the learning with errors problem (LWE). As the citation reads:

Regev’s work has ushered in a revolution in cryptography, in both theory and practice. On the theoretical side, LWE has served as a simple and yet amazingly versatile foundation for nearly every kind of cryptographic object imaginable—along with many that were unimaginable until recently, and which still have no known constructions without LWE. Toward the practical end, LWE and its direct descendants are at the heart of several efficient real-world cryptosystems.

Regev's most influential other work on lattices includes cryptanalysis of the GGH and NTRU signature schemes in joint work with Phong Q. Nguyen, for which they won a best paper award at Eurocrypt 2006; introducing the ring learning with errors problem in joint work with Chris Peikert and Vadim Lyubashevsky; and proving a converse to Minkowski's theorem and exploring its applications in joint works with his student Noah Stephens-Davidowitz and his former postdoc Daniel Dadush.

In addition to his work on lattices, Regev has also done work in a large number of other areas in theoretical computer science and mathematics. These include quantum computing, communication complexity, hardness of approximation, online algorithms, combinatorics, probability, and dimension reduction. He has also recently become interested in topics in biology, and particularly RNA splicing.

Regev is an associate editor in chief of the journal Theory of Computing, and is a co-founder and organizer of the TCS+ online seminar series.

In August 2023 Regev published a preprint describing an algorithm to factor integers with $\sim O(n^{3/2})$ quantum gates which would be more efficient than Shor's algorithm which uses $\sim O(n^{2})$, but would require more qubits $\sim O(n^{3/2})$ of quantum memory against Shor's $\sim O(n)\$. A variant has been proposed that could reduce the space to around the same amount.

== Recognition ==
Regev was a 2005 recipient of the Krill Prize. He won the 2018 Gödel Prize for his work on learning with errors. He was named as an ACM Fellow, in the 2025 class of Fellows, "for contributions to computational complexity, lattice-based cryptography, and quantum computing".
