= NIST Post-Quantum Cryptography Standardization =

Project by NIST to standardize post-quantum cryptography

Post-Quantum Cryptography Standardization is a program and competition by NIST to update their standards to include post-quantum cryptography. It was announced at PQCrypto 2016; the process has been going on over four rounds during several years. Starting 2022, a second process has been spun off to standardize further signature schemes (see below). The first four algorithms selected for standardization were announced in 2022, with a fifth one in 2025.

== Background ==
Academic research on the potential impact of quantum computing dates back to at least 2001. A NIST published report from April 2016 cites experts that acknowledge the possibility of quantum technology to render the commonly used RSA algorithm insecure by 2030. As a result, a need to standardize quantum-secure cryptographic primitives was pursued. Since most symmetric primitives are relatively easy to modify in a way that makes them quantum resistant, efforts have focused on public-key cryptography, namely digital signatures and key encapsulation mechanisms. In December 2016 NIST initiated a standardization process by announcing a call for proposals.

== Results ==
Until 2026, five algorithms have been selected for standardization by NIST:

- ML-KEM a.k.a. Kyber, a key encapsulation algorithm based on modular lattices,
- ML-DSA a.k.a. Dilithium, a signature algorithm, also based on modular lattices,
- SLH-DSA a.k.a. SPHINCS+, a signature algorithm whose security solely relies on hash functions,
- FN-DSA, a.k.a. Falcon, a signature scheme using fast fourier sampling and NTRU lattices (standard pending),
- HQC-KEM, a.k.a. HQC, a key encapsulation algorithm based on error-correcting codes (standard pending)

On August 13, 2024, NIST released final versions of its first three Post Quantum Crypto Standards. According to the release announcement:

While there have been no substantive changes made to the standards since the draft versions, NIST has changed the algorithms’ names to specify the versions that appear in the three finalized standards, which are:

- Federal Information Processing Standard (FIPS) 203, intended as the primary standard for general encryption. Among its advantages are comparatively small encryption keys that two parties can exchange easily, as well as its speed of operation. The standard is based on the CRYSTALS-Kyber algorithm, which has been renamed ML-KEM, short for Module-Lattice-Based Key-Encapsulation Mechanism.
- FIPS 204, intended as the primary standard for protecting digital signatures. The standard uses the CRYSTALS-Dilithium algorithm, which has been renamed ML-DSA, short for Module-Lattice-Based Digital Signature Algorithm.
- FIPS 205, also designed for digital signatures. The standard employs the SPHINCS+ algorithm, which has been renamed SLH-DSA, short for Stateless Hash-Based Digital Signature Algorithm. The standard is based on a different math approach than ML-DSA, and it is intended as a backup method in case ML-DSA proves vulnerable.
- Similarly, when the draft FIPS 206 standard built around FALCON is released, the algorithm will be dubbed FN-DSA, short for FFT (fast-Fourier transform) over NTRU-Lattice-Based Digital Signature Algorithm.

On March 11, 2025 NIST released Hamming Quasi-Cyclic (HQC) as the fifth algorithm for post-quantum asymmetric encryption as used for key encapsulation / exchange. The new algorithm is as a backup for ML-KEM, the main algorithm for general encryption. HQC is a code-based scheme using different math than ML-KEM, thus mitigating possible weaknesses should any be found in the lattice-based ML-KEM. The draft standard incorporating the HQC algorithm is expected in early 2026 with the final in 2027.

As of mid-2026, FIPS 206 (FN-DSA, based on FALCON) remained a draft standard. NIST submitted the draft for internal approval on August 28, 2025, and, as of April 2026, the Initial Public Draft had not yet been released pending final internal clearance; the final standard was expected in late 2026 or early 2027. Unlike ML-KEM, ML-DSA, and SLH-DSA, FN-DSA's signing process relies on floating-point Gaussian sampling, which is difficult to implement safely and in constant time; NIST has cited this complexity as the main reason for FN-DSA's longer standardization timeline compared with the other three algorithms.

== Process ==
The process involved several rounds over several years. Twenty-three signature schemes and fifty-nine encryption/KEM schemes were submitted by the initial submission deadline at the end of 2017 of which sixty-nine total were deemed complete and proper and participated in the first round. Seven of these, of which three are signature schemes, advanced to the third round, which was announced in July 2020.

=== Round one ===
Under consideration were:
(~~strikethrough~~ means it had been withdrawn)

Type	PKE/KEM	Signature	Signature & PKE/KEM
Lattice	Compact LWE; CRYSTALS-Kyber; Ding Key Exchange; EMBLEM and R.EMBLEM; FrodoKEM; ~~HILA5~~ (withdrawn and merged into Round5); KCL (pka OKCN/AKCN/CNKE); KINDI; LAC; LIMA; Lizard; LOTUS; NewHope; NTRUEncrypt; NTRU-HRSS-KEM; NTRU Prime; Odd Manhattan; ~~Round2~~ (withdrawn and merged into Round5); Round5 (merger of Round2 and Hila5, announced 4 August 2018); SABER; Three Bears; Titanium	CRYSTALS-Dilithium; DRS; FALCON; pqNTRUSign; qTESLA	
Code-based	BIG QUAKE; BIKE; Classic McEliece + NTS-KEM; DAGS; ~~Edon-K~~; HQC; ~~LAKE~~ (withdrawn and merged into ROLLO); LEDAkem; LEDApkc; Lepton; ~~LOCKER~~ (withdrawn and merged into ROLLO); McNie; NTS-KEM; ROLLO (merger of Ouroboros-R, LAKE and LOCKER); ~~Ouroboros-R~~ (withdrawn and merged into ROLLO); QC-MDPC KEM; Ramstake; RLCE-KEM; RQC	pqsigRM; RaCoSS; ~~RankSign~~	
Hash-based		Gravity-SPHINCS; SPHINCS+	
Multivariate	CFPKM; Giophantus	DualModeMS; GeMSS; Gui; HiMQ-3; LUOV; MQDSS; Rainbow	~~SRTPI~~; DME
Braid group		WalnutDSA	
Supersingular elliptic curve isogeny	SIKE		
Satirical submission			pqRSA
Other	Guess Again; ~~HK17~~; Mersenne-756839; ~~RVB~~	Picnic	

==== Round one submissions published attacks ====
- Guess Again by Lorenz Panny
- RVB by Lorenz Panny
- RaCoSS by Daniel J. Bernstein, Andreas Hülsing, Tanja Lange and Lorenz Panny
- HK17 by Daniel J. Bernstein and Tanja Lange
- SRTPI by Bo-Yin Yang
- WalnutDSA
  - by Ward Beullens and Simon R. Blackburn
  - by Matvei Kotov, Anton Menshov and Alexander Ushakov
- DRS by Yang Yu and Léo Ducas
- DAGS by Elise Barelli and Alain Couvreur
- Edon-K by Matthieu Lequesne and Jean-Pierre Tillich
- RLCE by Alain Couvreur, Matthieu Lequesne, and Jean-Pierre Tillich
- Hila5 by Daniel J. Bernstein, Leon Groot Bruinderink, Tanja Lange and Lorenz Panny
- Giophantus by Ward Beullens, Wouter Castryck and Frederik Vercauteren
- RankSign by Thomas Debris-Alazard and Jean-Pierre Tillich
- McNie by Philippe Gaborit; Terry Shue Chien Lau and Chik How Tan

=== Round two ===
Candidates moving on to the second round were announced on January 30, 2019. They are:

Type	PKE/KEM	Signature
Lattice	CRYSTALS-Kyber; FrodoKEM; LAC; NewHope; NTRU (merger of NTRUEncrypt and NTRU-HRSS-KEM); NTRU Prime; Round5 (merger of Round2 and Hila5, announced 4 August 2018); SABER; Three Bears	CRYSTALS-Dilithium; FALCON; qTESLA
Code-based	BIKE; Classic McEliece; HQC; LEDAcrypt (merger of LEDAkem and LEDApkc); NTS-KEM; ROLLO (merger of Ouroboros-R, LAKE and LOCKER); RQC	
Hash-based		SPHINCS+
Multivariate		GeMSS; LUOV; MQDSS; Rainbow
Supersingular elliptic curve isogeny	SIKE	
Zero-knowledge proofs		Picnic

=== Round three ===
On July 22, 2020, NIST announced seven finalists ("first track"), as well as eight alternate algorithms ("second track"). The first track contains the algorithms which appear to have the most promise, and will be considered for standardization at the end of the third round. Algorithms in the second track could still become part of the standard, after the third round ends. NIST expects some of the alternate candidates to be considered in a fourth round. NIST also suggests it may re-open the signature category for new schemes proposals in the future.

On June 7–9, 2021, NIST conducted the third PQC standardization conference, virtually. The conference included candidates' updates and discussions on implementations, on performances, and on security issues of the candidates. A small amount of focus was spent on intellectual property concerns.

==== Finalists ====
Type	PKE/KEM	Signature
Lattice	CRYSTALS-Kyber; NTRU; SABER	CRYSTALS-Dilithium; FALCON
Code-based	Classic McEliece	
Multivariate		Rainbow

==== Alternate candidates ====
Type	PKE/KEM	Signature
Lattice	FrodoKEM; NTRU Prime	
Code-based	BIKE; HQC	
Hash-based		SPHINCS+
Multivariate		GeMSS
Supersingular elliptic curve isogeny	SIKE	
Zero-knowledge proofs		Picnic

==== Intellectual property concerns ====
After NIST's announcement regarding the finalists and the alternate candidates, various intellectual property concerns were voiced, notably surrounding lattice-based schemes such as Kyber and NewHope. NIST holds signed statements from submitting groups clearing any legal claims, but there is still a concern that third parties could raise claims. NIST claims that they will take such considerations into account while picking the winning algorithms.

==== Round three submissions published attacks ====
- Rainbow: by Ward Beullens on a classical computer

==== Adaptations ====
During this round, some candidates have shown to be vulnerable to some attack vectors. It forces these candidates to adapt accordingly:

CRYSTAL-Kyber and SABER
may change the nested hashes used in their proposals in order for their security claims to hold.
FALCON
side channel attack using electromagnetic measurements to extract the secret signing keys. A masking may be added in order to resist the attack. This adaptation affects performance and should be considered whilst standardizing.

=== Selected Algorithms 2022 ===
On July 5, 2022, NIST announced the first group of winners from its six-year competition.

Type	PKE/KEM	Signature
Lattice	CRYSTALS-Kyber	CRYSTALS-Dilithium; Falcon
Hash-based		SPHINCS+

=== Round four ===
On July 5, 2022, NIST announced four candidates for PQC Standardization Round 4.

Type	PKE/KEM
Code-based	BIKE; Classic McEliece; HQC
Supersingular elliptic curve isogeny	SIKE (Broken August 5, 2022)

=== Round four submissions published attacks ===
- SIKE: by Wouter Castryck and Thomas Decru on a classical computer

=== Selected Algorithm 2025 ===
On March 11, 2025, NIST announced the selection of a backup algorithm for KEM.

Type	PKE/KEM
Code-based	HQC

== Additional Digital Signature Scheme Process ==
In 2022, NIST announced a second standardization process, citing a lack of further signature candidates to standardize, especially considering schemes not relying on structured lattices.

=== Round One ===
NIST received 50 submissions and deemed 40 to be complete and proper according to the submission requirements. Under consideration are:
(~~strikethrough~~ means it has been withdrawn)

Type	Signature
Lattice	EagleSign; EHTv3 and EHTv4; HAETAE; HAWK; HuFu; Raccoon; SQUIRRELS
Code-based	CROSS; Enhanced pqsigRM; FuLeeca; LESS; MEDS; Wave
MPC-in-the-Head	MIRA; MiRitH; MQOM; PERK; RYDE; SDitH
Multivariate	3WISE ("the submitter agrees that the scheme is insecure, but prefers to not withdraw in the hope that studying the scheme will advance cryptanalysis"); Biscuit; DME-Sign ("Our first impression is that the attack works and we are checking the details of the attack .We are implementing a variant of the DME that may resist the attack but we have to verify it."); HPPC; MAYO; PROV; QR-UOV; SNOVA; TUOV; UOV; VOX
Supersingular elliptic curve isogeny	SQIsign
Symmetric-based	AIMer; Ascon-Sign; FAEST; SPHINCS-alpha
Other	ALTEQ; eMLE-Sig 2.0; KAZ-SIGN; Preon; Xifrat1-Sign.I

=== Round one submissions published attacks ===
- 3WISE by Daniel Smith-Tone
- EagleSign by Mehdi Tibouchi
- KAZ-SIGN by Daniel J. Bernstein; Scott Fluhrer
- Xifrat1-Sign.I by Lorenz Panny
- eMLE-Sig 2.0 by Mehdi Tibouchi (implementation by Lorenz Panny)
- HPPC by Ward Beullens; Pierre Briaud, Maxime Bros, and Ray Perlner
- ALTEQ by Markku-Juhani O. Saarinen (implementation only?)
- Biscuit by Charles Bouillaguet
- MEDS by Markku-Juhani O. Saarinen and Ward Beullens (implementation only)
- FuLeeca by Felicitas Hörmann and Wessel van Woerden
- LESS by the LESS team (implementation only)
- DME-Sign by Markku-Juhani O. Saarinen (implementation only?); Pierre Briaud, Maxime Bros, Ray Perlner, and Daniel Smith-Tone
- EHTv3 by Eamonn Postlethwaite and Wessel van Woerden; Keegan Ryan and Adam Suhl
- Enhanced pqsigRM by Thomas Debris-Alazard, Pierre Loisel and Valentin Vasseur; Pierre Briaud, Maxime Bros, Ray Perlner and Daniel Smith-Tone
- HAETAE by Markku-Juhani O. Saarinen (implementation only?)
- HuFu by Markku-Juhani O. Saarinen
- SDitH by Kevin Carrier and Jean-Pierre Tillich; Kevin Carrier, Valérian Hatey, and Jean-Pierre Tillich
- VOX by Hiroki Furue and Yasuhiko Ikematsu
- AIMer by Fukang Liu, Mohammad Mahzoun, Morten Øygarden, Willi Meier
- SNOVA by Yasuhiko Ikematsu and Rika Akiyama
- PROV by Ludovic Perret, and River Moreira Ferreira (implementation only)

=== Round Two ===
NIST deemed 14 submissions to pass to the second round.

Type	Signature	Technique(s) Used	Hard Problem
Lattice	HAWK	Hash-and-sign	lattice problems
Code-based	CROSS	Fiat–Shamir heuristic	Syndrome Decoding Problem
Code-based	LESS	Fiat–Shamir heuristic	Linear Equivalence Problem
MPC-in-the-Head	Mirath (merge of MIRA and MiRitH)	"in the head", Fiat–Shamir heuristic	MinRank (matrix-based)
MPC-in-the-Head	MQOM	"in the head", Fiat–Shamir heuristic	Multivariable Quadratic Problem
MPC-in-the-Head	PERK	"in the head", Fiat–Shamir heuristic	Permuted Kernel Problem (matrix-based)
MPC-in-the-Head	RYDE	"in the head", Fiat–Shamir heuristic	Rank Syndrome Decoding Problem (code-based)
MPC-in-the-Head	SDitH	"in the head", Fiat–Shamir heuristic	Syndrome Decoding Problem (code-based)
Multivariate	MAYO	Unbalanced Oil and Vinegar	Multivariable Quadratic Problem
Multivariate	QR-UOV	Unbalanced Oil and Vinegar	Multivariable Quadratic Problem
Multivariate	SNOVA	Unbalanced Oil and Vinegar	Multivariable Quadratic Problem
Multivariate	UOV	Unbalanced Oil and Vinegar	Multivariable Quadratic Problem
Supersingular elliptic curve isogeny	SQIsign	Fiat–Shamir heuristic	Endomorphism Ring Problem
Symmetric-based	FAEST	"in the head", Fiat–Shamir heuristic	breaking AES

=== Round Three ===
Nine candidates advanced from Round Two to Round Three:

Type	Signature	Technique(s) Used	Hard Problem
Lattice	HAWK	Hash-and-sign	Lattice Isomorphism Problem
MPC-in-the-Head	MQOM	"in the head", Fiat–Shamir heuristic	Multivariable Quadratic Problem
MPC-in-the-Head	SDitH	"in the head", Fiat–Shamir heuristic	Syndrome Decoding Problem (code-based)
MPC-in-the-Head	FAEST	"in the head", Fiat–Shamir heuristic	breaking AES
Multivariate	MAYO	Unbalanced Oil and Vinegar	Multivariable Quadratic Problem
Multivariate	QR-UOV	Unbalanced Oil and Vinegar	Multivariable Quadratic Problem
Multivariate	SNOVA	Unbalanced Oil and Vinegar	Multivariable Quadratic Problem
Multivariate	UOV	Unbalanced Oil and Vinegar	Multivariable Quadratic Problem
Supersingular elliptic curve isogeny	SQIsign	Fiat–Shamir heuristic	Endomorphism Ring Problem

NIST has indicated that at least the multivariate candidates will probably require a further round of evaluation.

Anthropic weakened HAWK with Claude Mythos, so HAWK was withdrawn from the competition, as parameter adjustments would make it incompetitive.

== See also ==
- Advanced Encryption Standard process
- CAESAR Competition – Competition to design authenticated encryption schemes
- Lattice-based cryptography
- NIST hash function competition
