= Joseph H. Silverman =

American mathematician (born 1955)

- Born: March 27, 1955 (age 71); New York City, New York, U.S.
- Education: Harvard University
- Awards: Leroy P. Steele Prize (1998)
- Scientific career
- Fields: Mathematics
- Workplaces: Brown University
- Doctoral advisor: John Tate
- Doctoral students: Michelle Manes; Katherine E. Stange

Joseph Hillel Silverman (born March 27, 1955) is a professor of mathematics at Brown University working in arithmetic geometry, arithmetic dynamics, and cryptography.

== Biography ==
Joseph Silverman received an Sc.B. from Brown University in 1977 and a Ph.D. from Harvard University in 1982 under the direction of John Tate. He taught at M.I.T. (1982–1986) and at Boston University (1986–1988) before taking a position at Brown in 1988.

Silverman has published more than 150 research articles, written or coauthored eight books, and edited three conference proceedings; his work has been cited more than 7500 times, by over 4000 distinct authors. He has served on the editorial boards of Algebra and Number Theory and New York Journal of Mathematics.

== Industry ==
In 1996, Silverman, along with Jeffrey Hoffstein, Jill Pipher and Daniel Lieman, founded NTRU Cryptosystems, Inc. to market their cryptographic algorithms, NTRUEncrypt and NTRUSign.

== Awards ==
In 2012 Silverman became a fellow of the American Mathematical Society. He was a Guggenheim Fellow (1998) and is a recipient of the NES MAA Award for Distinguished Teaching (2011). In 2022, he was an invited speaker at the International Congress of Mathematicians and spoke on the topic "Arithmetic Dynamics."

== American Mathematical Society ==
Silverman has been a member of governance of the American Mathematical Society, including stints on the AMS Council (2008-2011), the AMS Executive Committee (2009-2013), and the AMS Board of Trustees (2015-2025).

== Books ==
Silverman has written two graduate texts on elliptic curves, The Arithmetic of Elliptic Curves (1986) and Advanced Topics in the Arithmetic of Elliptic Curves (1994). For these two books he received a Steele Prize for Mathematical Exposition from the American Mathematical Society, which cited them by saying that “Silverman's volumes have become standard references on one of the most exciting areas of algebraic geometry and number theory.” Silverman has also written four undergraduate texts: Rational Points on Elliptic Curves (1992, co-authored with John Tate), A Friendly Introduction to Number Theory (3rd ed. 2005), An Introduction to Mathematical Cryptography (2008, co-authored with Jeffrey Hoffstein and Jill Pipher), and Abstract Algebra: An Integrated Approach (2022). Additional graduate-level texts authored by Silverman are Diophantine Geometry: An Introduction (2000, co-authored with Marc Hindry) and The Arithmetic of Dynamical Systems (2007).

== Publications ==
- ———; Hindry, M. (23 March 2000), Diophantine geometry: An introduction, Springer, ISBN 0-387-98981-1.
- ———; Cornell, G.; Stevens, G. (1997), Modular forms and Fermat's Last Theorem, Springer, ISBN 0-387-94609-8.
- ———; Hoffstein, J.; Pipher, J. (12 August 2008), An introduction to mathematical cryptography, Springer, ISBN 978-0-387-77993-5.
- ——— (1986), The arithmetic of elliptic curves, 世界图书出版公司, ISBN 0-387-96203-4. Silverman, Joseph H. (2009). 2nd edition. Springer. ISBN 9780387094946.
- ——— (1994), Advanced topics in the arithmetic of elliptic curves, Springer, ISBN 0-387-94328-5.
- ——— (5 May 2010), The arithmetic of dynamical systems, Springer, ISBN 978-0-387-69903-5.
- ——— (2006), A friendly introduction to number theory, Pearson Prentice Hall, ISBN 978-0-13-186137-4.
- ———; Tate, J. (18 November 1994), Rational points on elliptic curves, Springer, ISBN 0-387-97825-9. Silverman, Joseph H.; Tate, John T. (2015). 2nd edition. Springer. ISBN 9783319185880.
- - - - (2022) Abstract Algebra: An Integrated Approach, American Mathematical Society, ISBN 978-1-4704-6860-6.
