= HRSS =

HRSS may refer to:

- Croatian Peasant Party (Croatian: Hrvatska seljačka stranka), former name of a political party in Croatia
- HRSS (cryptography), an instantiation of NTRU cryptography used in CECPQ2
- Ministry of Human Resources and Social Security, a Chinese central government department
