= Jill Pipher =

American mathematician (born 1955)

Jill C. Pipher
- Education: University of California, Los Angeles
- Scientific career
- Fields: Mathematics
- Workplaces: Brown University
- Doctoral advisor: John B. Garnett

Jill Catherine Pipher (born December 14, 1955, in Harrisburg, Pennsylvania) is an American mathematician. She served as president of the American Mathematical Society (AMS, 2019–2020) and president of the Association for Women in Mathematics (AWM, 2011–2013). She was the first director of the Institute for Computational and Experimental Research in Mathematics (ICERM, 2011–2016), an NSF-funded mathematics institute based in Providence, Rhode Island.

== Contributions ==
Pipher's research areas include harmonic analysis, Fourier analysis, partial differential equations, and cryptography. She has published more than 60 research articles and has coauthored with Jeffrey Hoffstein and Joseph Silverman a textbook titled An Introduction to Mathematical Cryptography.

== Education and career ==
Pipher is currently the Elisha Benjamin Andrews Professor of Mathematics at Brown University. She received a B.A. from the University of California, Los Angeles in 1979 and a PhD from UCLA in 1985 under the direction of John B. Garnett. She taught at the University of Chicago (1985–1990) before taking a position at Brown in 1990, where she served as chair of the Mathematics Department from 2005 to 2008.

In 1996, Pipher, along with Jeffrey Hoffstein, Daniel Lieman and Joseph Silverman, founded NTRU Cryptosystems, Inc., now part of Security Innovation, Inc. to market their cryptographic algorithms, NTRUEncrypt and NTRUSign.

== Recognition ==
In 2012 she became a fellow of the American Mathematical Society. In 2017, she was selected as a fellow of the Association for Women in Mathematics in the inaugural class. In 2019 she was named a SIAM Fellow "for her profound contributions in analysis and partial differential equations, groundbreaking work in public key cryptography, and outstanding scientific leadership". She was named to the 2021 class of Fellows of the American Association for the Advancement of Science.

In 2014 Pipher was a Mathematical Association of America Invited Lecturer at the Joint Mathematics Meetings, speaking on The Mathematics of Lattice-based Cryptography The Association for Women in Mathematics named her as their Noether Lecturer for 2018.

In 2019–2020, she served as the 65th president of the American Mathematical Society. She was the third woman to be elected to this position, following Julia Robinson (1983–1984) and Cathleen Synge Morawetz (1995–1996).
