= Ribenboim Prize =

- Description: Distinguished research in number theory by Canadian-linked mathematicians
- Country: Canada
- Presented by: Canadian Number Theory Association (CNTA)
- Reward: Plenary talk at CNTA award ceremony

The Ribenboim Prize, named in honour of Paulo Ribenboim, is awarded by the Canadian Number Theory Association for distinguished research in number theory by a mathematician who is Canadian or has close connections to Canadian mathematics. Normally, the winner will have received their Ph.D. in the last 12 years. The winner is expected to give a plenary talk at the award ceremony.

Due to the COVID-19 pandemic, the 2020, 2022, and 2024 Ribenboim Prizes were all awarded in 2024.

== Winners ==
Year	Name	University
1999	Andrew Granville	University of Georgia
2002	Henri Darmon	McGill University
2004	Michael A. Bennett	University of British Columbia
2006	Vinayak Vatsal	University of British Columbia
2008	Adrian Iovita	Concordia University
2010	Valentin Blomer	University of Toronto, Universität Göttingen
2012	Dragos Ghioca	University of British Columbia
2014	Florian Herzig	University of Toronto
2016	Jacob Tsimerman	University of Toronto
2018	Maksym Radziwill	McGill University
2020	Katherine E. Stange	University of Colorado—Boulder
2022	Dimitris Koukoulopoulos	Université de Montréal
2024	Héctor Pastén	Pontificia Universidad Católica de Chile

== See also ==
- List of mathematics awards
