= Daniel Bump =

American mathematician

Daniel Willis Bump (born 13 May 1952) is a mathematician who is a professor at Stanford University working in representation theory. He is a fellow of the American Mathematical Society since 2015, for "contributions to number theory, representation theory, combinatorics, and random matrix theory, as well as mathematical exposition".

He has a Bachelor of Arts from Reed College, where he graduated in 1974. He obtained his Ph.D. from the University of Chicago in 1982 under the supervision of Walter Lewis Baily, Jr. Among Bump's doctoral students is president of the National Association of Mathematicians, Edray Goins.

== Selected publications ==
=== Articles ===
- Bump, D., Friedberg, S., & Hoffstein, J. (1990). "Nonvanishing theorems for L-functions of modular forms and their derivatives". Inventiones Mathematicae, 102(1), pp. 543–618.
- Bump, D., & Ginzburg, D. (1992). "Symmetric square L-functions on GL(r)". Annals of Mathematics, 136(1), pp. 137–205. doi:10.2307/2946548
- Bump, D., Friedberg, S., & Hoffstein, J. (1996). "On some applications of automorphic forms to number theory", Bulletin of the American Mathematical Society, 33(2), pp. 157–175. doi:10.1090/S0273-0979-96-00654-4
- Bump, D., Choi, K. K., Kurlberg, P., & Vaaler, J. (2000). "A local Riemann hypothesis, I". Mathematische Zeitschrift, 233(1), pp. 1–18.
- Bump, D., & Diaconis, P. (2002). "Toeplitz minors". Journal of Combinatorial Theory, Series A, 97(2), pp. 252–271.
- Bump, D., Gamburd, A. (2006). On the averages of characteristic polynomials from classical groups, Commun. Math. Phys., 265(1), pp. 227–274. doi:10.1007/s00220-006-1503-1
- Brubaker, B., Bump, D., & Friedberg, S. (2011). Schur polynomials and the Yang-Baxter equation, Commun. Math. Phys., 308(2), pp. 281–301. doi:10.1007/s00220-011-1345-3

=== Books ===
- Bump, D. (1984). Automorphic forms on GL(3,$R$), Springer-Verlag.
- Bump, D. (1996). Automorphic forms and representations. Cambridge University Press. 1998 pbk edition
- Bump, D. (1998). Algebraic Geometry. World Scientific.
- Bump, D. (2004). Lie Groups. Springer. ISBN 978-0387211541. 2nd edition, 2013
- Bump, D., & Schilling A. (2017). "Crystal Bases: Representations and Combinatorics". World Scientific

== See also ==
- GNU Go
