= NTRU =

Public-key cryptosystem that uses lattice-based cryptography

NTRU is an open-source public-key cryptosystem that uses lattice-based cryptography to encrypt and decrypt data. It consists of two algorithms: NTRUEncrypt, which is used for encryption, and NTRUSign, which is used for digital signatures. Unlike other popular public-key cryptosystems, it is resistant to attacks using Shor's algorithm. NTRUEncrypt was patented, but it was placed in the public domain in 2017. NTRUSign is patented, but it can be used by software under the GPL.

== History ==
The first version of the system, which was called NTRU, was developed in 1996 by mathematicians Jeffrey Hoffstein, Jill Pipher, and Joseph H. Silverman. That same year, the developers of NTRU joined with Daniel Lieman and founded the company NTRU Cryptosystems, Inc., and were given a patent on the cryptosystem. The name "NTRU", chosen for the company and soon applied to the system as well, was originally derived from the pun Number Theorists 'R' Us or, alternatively, stood for Number Theory Research Unit. In 2009, the company was acquired by Security Innovation, a software security corporation. In 2013, Damien Stehle and Ron Steinfeld created a provably secure version of NTRU, which is being studied by a post-quantum crypto group chartered by the European Commission.

In May 2016, Daniel Bernstein, Chitchanok Chuengsatiansup, Tanja Lange and Christine van Vredendaal released NTRU Prime, which adds defenses against a potential attack on NTRU by eliminating algebraic structure they considered worrisome. However, after more than 20 years of scrutiny, no concrete approach to attack the original NTRU by exploiting its algebraic structure has been found so far.

NTRU became a finalist in the third round of NIST's Post-Quantum Cryptography Standardization project, whereas NTRU Prime became an alternate candidate.

== Performance ==
At equivalent cryptographic strength, NTRU performs costly private-key operations much faster than RSA does. The time of performing an RSA private operation increases as the cube of the key size, whereas that of an NTRU operation increases quadratically.

In 2010, the Department of Electrical Engineering, University of Leuven, noted that "[using] a modern GTX280 GPU, a throughput of up to 200000 encryptions per second can be reached at a security level of 256 bits. Comparing this to a symmetric cipher (not a very common comparison), this is only around 20 times slower than a recent AES implementation."

== Resistance to quantum-computer-based attacks ==
Unlike RSA and elliptic-curve cryptography, NTRU is not known to be vulnerable to attacks from quantum computers. The National Institute of Standards and Technology wrote in a 2009 survey that "[there] are viable alternatives for both public key encryption and signatures that are not vulnerable to Shor's Algorithm" and that "[of] the various lattice based cryptographic schemes that have been developed, the NTRU family of cryptographic algorithms appears to be the most practical". The European Union's PQCRYPTO project (Horizon 2020 ICT-645622) is evaluating the provably secure Stehle–Steinfeld version of NTRU (not original NTRU algorithm itself) as a potential European standard. However the Stehle–Steinfeld version of NTRU is "significantly less efficient than the original scheme".

== Standardization ==
- The standard IEEE Std 1363.1, issued in 2008, standardizes lattice-based public-key cryptography, especially NTRUEncrypt.
- The standard X9.98 standardizes lattice-based public-key cryptography, especially NTRUEncrypt, as part of the X9 standards for the financial services industry.
- The PQCRYPTO project of the European Commission is considering standardization of the provably secure Stehle–Steinfeld version of NTRU.

== Implementations ==
Originally, NTRU was only available as a proprietary, for-pay library, and open-source authors were threatened with legal action. It was not until 2011 that the first open-source implementation appeared, and in 2013, Security Innovation exempted open-source projects from having to get a patent license and released an NTRU reference implementation under the GPL v2.

Implementations:

- OpenSSH by default uses NTRU Prime combined with the X25519 ECDH key exchange since August 2022, included in version 9.0.
- The GPL-licensed reference implementation
- A BSD-licensed library
- bouncycastle
- Lokinet was the first onion router implementing NTRU algorithm for its intraweb and End-2-End Encrypted events.
- GoldBug Messenger was the first chat and E-mail client with NTRU algorithm under open-source license, which is based on the Spot-On Encryption Suite Kernels.
- Additionally, wolfSSL provides support for NTRU cipher suites in a lightweight C implementation.
