= Michelle Manes =

American mathematician

- Occupations: Mathematician, Professor, Deputy Director of the American Institute of Mathematics

Academic background
- Education: University of California, Berkeley (BA) Boston University (Ed. M) Brown University (PhD, MSc)

Academic work
- Discipline: Mathematics
- Sub-discipline: Mathematics Education, Number Theory, Algebraic Geometry, Dynamical Systems
- Institutions: University of Hawai'i at Mānoa, American Institute of Mathematics

Michelle Ann Manes is an American mathematician whose research interests span the fields of number theory, algebraic geometry, and dynamical systems. She is a professor of mathematics at the University of Hawaii at Mānoa, and has been a program director for algebra and number theory at the National Science Foundation.

== Education and career ==
Manes graduated from the University of California, Berkeley in 1991, and earned a master's degree in deaf education at Boston University in 1993, with a concentration in mathematics education. She worked in various capacities in the Boston area as a mathematics educator from 1993 to 2003, when she returned to graduate studies. She completed a second master's degree in mathematics in 2004 and a Ph.D. in 2007 at Brown University; her dissertation, Arithmetic Dynamics of Rational Maps, was supervised by Joseph H. Silverman. After a short-term position at the University of Southern California, she joined the University of Hawaiʻi at Mānoa faculty in 2008. She joined the American Institute of Mathematics as Deputy Director in 2022.

Continuing her interest in mathematics education, Manes co-founded the Math Teachers’ Circle of Hawai‘i (MaTCH) in 2010.

Manes was one of four female editors and chiefs of La Mathematica.

== Recognition ==
In 2015, Manes won the Golden Section Award for Distinguished College or University Teaching of Mathematics of the Mathematical Association of America, and in 2017 she won the Regents’ Medal for Excellence in Teaching of the University of Hawaii.

Also in 2017, the Association for Women in Mathematics gave her their Service Award. Manes was named an AWM Fellow in the 2020 class of fellows by the Association for Women in Mathematics, for "supporting research careers for women in mathematics through leadership in the WIN Network and AWM Advance Committees to enable the formation of research networks for women in many areas of mathematics". She was elected as a Fellow of the American Mathematical Society in the 2024 class of fellows.
