= Peter Jones (mathematician) =

American mathematician

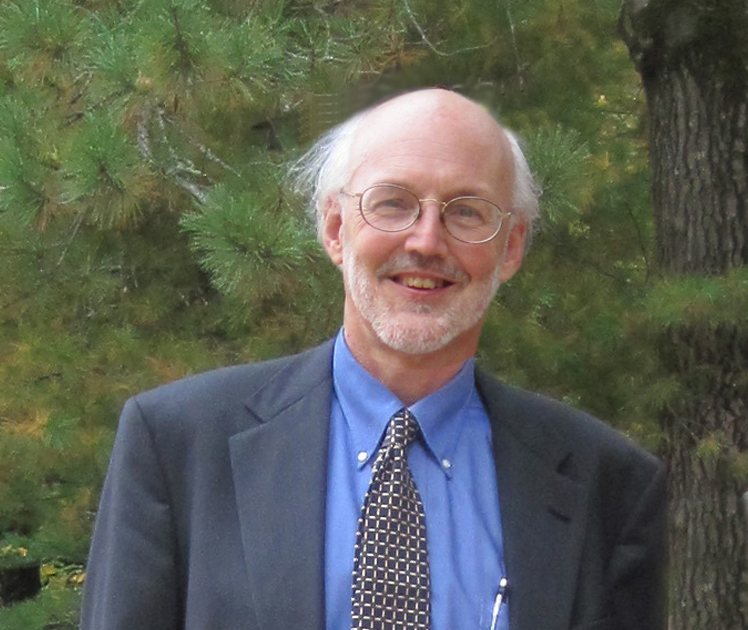
Peter Jones (mathematician)

Peter Wilcox Jones (born 1952) is a mathematician at Yale University, known for his work in harmonic analysis and fractal geometry. He received his Ph.D. at the University of California, Los Angeles in 1978, under the supervision of John B. Garnett. He received the Salem Prize in 1981. He is an elected member of the U.S. National Academy of Sciences (2008), the Royal Swedish Academy of Sciences (2008), and the American Academy of Arts and Sciences (1998). He is not related to the mathematician Vaughan Jones.
