= Robert McEliece =

American electrical engineer (1942–2019)

Robert J. McEliece (May 21, 1942 – May 8, 2019) was the Allen E. Puckett Professor and a professor of electrical engineering at the California Institute of Technology (Caltech) best known for his work in error-correcting coding and information theory. He was the 2004 recipient of the Claude E. Shannon Award and the 2009 recipient of the IEEE Alexander Graham Bell Medal. He was a life fellow of the IEEE and was elected to the National Academy of Engineering in 1998.

Born in Washington, D.C., and raised in Baltimore, McEliece was educated at Caltech (B.S. in 1964, Ph.D. in mathematics 1967) and attended Trinity College, Cambridge in 1964–65.

He began working at Caltech’s Jet Propulsion Laboratory as an undergraduate, and continued there until 1978. From 1978 until 1982 he was professor of mathematics and research professor at the Coordinated Science Laboratory, University of Illinois, Urbana-Champaign. During the 1970s, he collaborated with Elwyn Berlekamp at Cyclotomics.

In 1982 he returned to Caltech as professor of electrical engineering, retiring in 2007. At Caltech he won five teaching awards and advised 30 Ph.D. students. From 1978 until his retirement, McEliece consulted with the Jet Propulsion Laboratory on error-correcting coding schemes. Beginning in 1997, he consulted with SONY in Tokyo.

He had three daughters and one son. He died in Pasadena, California on May 8, 2019.

== Awards and recognitions ==
- Fellow of the Institute of Electrical and Electronics Engineers (1984) for contribution to information and coding theory research and applications.
- Fellow of the IEEE Information Theory Society

== Selected publications ==
- The theory of information and coding: A mathematical framework for communication. Addison-Wesley. 1977. ISBN 9780201135022.
- A Public-Key Cryptosystem Based on Algebraic Coding Theory, JPL Deep Space Network Progress Report 42– 44 (1978), pp. 114–116, Bibcode:1978DSNPR..44..114M
- On the Inherent Intractability of Certain Coding Problems (with E. R. Berlekamp and H. Van Tilborg), IEEE Trans. Inf. Theory IT-24 (1978), pp. 384–386, doi:10.1109/TIT.1978.1055873

== See also ==
- McEliece cryptosystem

Awards
Preceded by Gerard J. Foschini	IEEE Alexander Graham Bell Medal; 2009	Succeeded by John Cioffi
