= Katherine E. Stange =

Canadian-American mathematician

- Citizenship: Canada, United States
- Education: Brown University
- Known for: Number theory, Arithmetic geometry
- Awards: Fellow of Association for Women in Mathematics; Paul R. Halmos - Lester R. Ford Award of the Mathematical Association of America
- Scientific career
- Fields: Mathematics
- Workplaces: University of Colorado Boulder
- Thesis: Elliptic Nets and Elliptic Curves (2008)
- Doctoral advisor: Joseph H. Silverman
- Website: math.katestange.net

Katherine E. Stange is a Canadian-American mathematician and an associate professor of mathematics at the University of Colorado Boulder. She is a number theorist specializing in topics in arithmetic geometry.

== Education and career ==
Stange earned her PhD in mathematics from Brown University in 2008 under the supervision of Joseph H. Silverman. She was a National Science Foundation (NSF) Postdoctoral Fellow and Junior Lecturer at Harvard University from 2008 to 2009. She also held postdoctoral fellowships at Simon Fraser University, Pacific Institute for the Mathematical Sciences, and the University of British Columbia (2009–2011) and Stanford University (2011–2012). In 2012, Stange joined the faculty at the University of Colorado Boulder as an assistant professor. She was promoted to associate professor with indefinite tenure effective August 2018.

Stange has been active in Women in Numbers, the prototype for the Association for Women in Mathematics' Research Collaboration Networks for Women. She was co-organizer and proceedings co-editor of Directions in Number Theory: Proceedings of the 2014 WIN3 Workshop and a project leader for Women in Numbers 4. Stange served on the American Mathematical Society Committee on Women in Mathematics (CoWIM) from 2019–2020.

== Recognition ==
The Mathematical Association of America presented Stange and Lionel Levine the 2013 Paul R. Halmos - Lester R. Ford Award for outstanding paper in The American Mathematical Monthly for their paper How to make the most of a shared meal: plan the last bite first.

Stange was elected a Fellow of the Association for Women in Mathematics in the Class of 2021 "for leadership in the Women in Numbers Network by creating its website (the first of its kind), mentoring early-career researchers, organizing conferences, editing its proceedings volumes, and chairing its steering committee; and for service on AWM committees, including support of other research networks". She was named a 2021 Simons Fellow in Mathematics.

Stange is the 2020 recipient of the Ribenboim Prize, awarded biennially by the Canadian Number Theory Association for distinguished research in number theory by a mathematician who is Canadian or has close connections to Canadian mathematics.

She was elected to the 2026 class of Fellows of the American Mathematical Society.
