= Solomon Friedberg =

American mathematician

- Born: 1958 (age 67–68)
- Education: University of California, San Diego (B.A.); University of Chicago (Ph.D)
- Scientific career
- Workplaces: University of California, Santa Barbara; Boston College
- Thesis: Theta functions, liftings and generalized Hilbert modular forms
- Doctoral advisor: Harold Stark

Solomon Friedberg (born 1958) is an American mathematician specializing in automorphic forms, representation theory, and number theory.

== Education ==
Friedberg received his B.A. summa cum laude in 1978 from the University of California, San Diego, and his Ph.D. in 1982 from the University of Chicago, where he wrote his dissertation Theta functions, liftings and generalized Hilbert modular forms under Harold Stark.

== Career and research ==
From 1982 to 1985 he was a Benjamin Peirce Lecturer at Harvard University. In 1985 he joined the University of California, Santa Cruz, where he became assistant professor (1985), associate professor (1987), and full professor (1989). Since 1996 he has been a professor at Boston College, and from 2007 he also served as chair of the Mathematics Department. Solomon holds Boston College's James P. McIntyre Professorship of Mathematics.

He has held visiting positions at Brown University, the Institute for Advanced Study (1999), Columbia University (1990/91, as a Sloan Research Fellow), the Max Planck Institute for Mathematics in Bonn (1990), the Mathematical Sciences Research Institute (1994), IBM Almaden Research Center, the Hebrew University, the Tata Institute of Fundamental Research (1988), the Institut des Hautes Études Scientifiques (1985/86), the Technical University of Ankara, and the Weizmann Institute of Science.

Friedberg is a Fellow of the American Mathematical Society (AMS). He received the 2021 Award for Impact on the Teaching and Learning of Mathematics, also given by the AMS. In April 2025 he was elected a Fellow of the American Association for the Advancement of Science (AAAS) for his contributions to number theory, representation theory, and automorphic forms.

His early research focused on integral representations of automorphic L-functions. In joint work with Hervé Jacquet, he introduced what is now known as the Friedberg–Jacquet integral, providing an explicit relation between automorphic periods and central values of standard L-functions. This integral representation has since become a fundamental tool in the study of special values and period relations.

In 1989, together with Daniel Bump and Jeffrey Hoffstein, he applied analytic methods involving Dirichlet series in several complex variables to establish a first-order vanishing theorem for GL(2) L-functions under quadratic twists, yielding important arithmetic applications.

Beginning in the mid-1990s, he became one of the originators of the theory of Multiple Dirichlet Series (MDS), developed with Ben Brubaker, Dan Bump, Gautam Chinta, Dorian Goldfeld, and Jeff Hoffstein. The 1996 foundational paper by Bump, Friedberg, and Hoffstein introduced key analytic techniques for multivariable Dirichlet series. These objects—related to automorphic forms on metaplectic covers of reductive groups—generalize Euler products into twisted Euler products governed by higher-order residue symbols. Many of these series have meromorphic continuation and satisfy finite reflection groups of functional equations. From the late 2000s onward, these work uncovered unexpected connections between Multiple Dirichlet Series and combinatorial representation theory, quantum groups, and statistical mechanics, enriching the interplay between number theory and mathematical physics.

== Selected publications ==
- with Hervé Jacquet: The fundamental lemma of the Shalika subgroup of GL(4), American Mathematical Society, 1996.
- editor, Multiple Dirichlet series, automorphic forms, and analytic number theory (Bretton Woods Workshop, 2005), American Mathematical Society, 2006.
- co-editor with Daniel Bump, Dorian Goldfeld: Multiple Dirichlet series, L-functions and automorphic forms, Birkhäuser, 2012.
- with Ben Brubaker, Daniel Bump: Weyl group multiple Dirichlet series: Type A combinatorial theory, Annals of Mathematics Studies 175, Princeton University Press, 2011.
- with Bump, Jeffrey Hoffstein: On some applications of modular forms to number theory, Bulletin AMS, 33 (1996), 157–175.
- with Brubaker, Bump: Weyl Group Multiple Dirichlet Series I–III, in Proc. Symp. Pure Math. (2006); Invent. Math. 165 (2006), 325–355; Annals of Mathematics 166 (2007), 293–316.
- with Brubaker, Bump: Weyl Group Multiple Dirichlet Series, Eisenstein Series and Crystal Basis, Annals of Mathematics 173 (2011), 1081–1120.
- with Brubaker, Bump: Gauss sum combinatorics and metaplectic Eisenstein series, in Ginzburg–Lapid–Soudry (eds.), Automorphic forms and L-functions I: Global Aspects, Contemporary Mathematics 488, 2009, 61–81.
- with Brubaker, Bump: Schur Polynomials and the Yang–Baxter Equation, Communications in Mathematical Physics 308 (2011), 281–301.
- with Bump, Brubaker: Eisenstein series, crystals and ice, Notices of the AMS, December 2011.
