= John B. Garnett =

American mathematician

John Brady Garnett (born December 15, 1940) is an American mathematician at the University of California, Los Angeles, known for his work in harmonic analysis. He received his Ph.D. at the University of Washington in 1966, under the supervision of Irving Glicksberg. He received the Steele Prize for Mathematical Exposition in 2003 for his book, Bounded Analytic Functions. As of February 2025, he has supervised the dissertations of 26 students including Peter Jones, Jill Pipher, and Anthony Carbery.

In 2012 he became a fellow of the American Mathematical Society.

== Publications ==
- Analytic Capacity and Measure. Springer-Verlag. 1972. ISBN 3-540-06073-1.
- Bounded Analytic Functions. Academic Press. 1981. ISBN 0-122-76150-2.
- with Donald E. Marshall: Harmonic Measures. Cambridge University Press. 2005. ISBN 0-521-47018-8.
