= Adrian Ioviță =

Romanian-Canadian mathematician

- Born: June 28, 1954 (age 72); Timișoara, Romania
- Education: Boston University; University of Bucharest
- Awards: Ribenboim Prize (2008)
- Scientific career
- Fields: Mathematics
- Workplaces: Concordia University; University of Washington; McGill University
- Theses: p-adic Cohomology of Abelian Varieties (1996); On local classfield theory (1991)
- Doctoral advisor: Glenn H. Stevens (1996); Nicolae Popescu (1991)

Adrian Ioviță (born 28 June 1954) is a Romanian-Canadian mathematician, specializing in arithmetic algebraic geometry and p-adic cohomology theories.

== Education ==
Born in Timișoara, Romania, Ioviță received in 1978 his undergraduate degree in mathematics from the University of Bucharest. He worked as a researcher at the Institute of Mathematics of the Romanian Academy, obtaining a Ph.D. degree in 1991 from the University of Bucharest with thesis On local classfield theory written under the direction of Nicolae Popescu. He received in 1996 a doctorate in mathematics from Boston University. His doctoral thesis there was supervised by Glenn H. Stevens; the thesis title is p-adic Cohomology of Abelian Varieties.

== Career ==
As a postdoc from 1996 to 1998 in Montreal he was at McGill University and Concordia University. From 1998 to 2003 he was an assistant professor at the University of Washington. Since 2003 he is a full professor at Concordia University. He has held permanent positions at the University of Padua, and also in Paris, Münster, Jerusalem, and Nottingham.

== Awards ==
In 2008 Ioviță received the Ribenboim Prize. In 2018 he was an invited speaker, with Vincent Pilloni and Fabrizio Andreatta, with talk p-adic variation of automorphic sheaves (given by Pilloni) at the International Congress of Mathematicians in Rio de Janeiro.

== Selected publications ==
- Iovita, Adrian; Spiess, Michael (2001). "Logarithmic differential forms on p-adic symmetric spaces". Duke Mathematical Journal. 110 (2): 253–278. doi:10.1215/S0012-7094-01-11023-5. MR 1865241.
- Iovita, Adrian; Spiess, Michael (2003). "Derivatives of p-adic L-functions, Heegner cycles and monodromy modules attached to modular forms". Inventiones Mathematicae. 154 (2): 333–384. arXiv:math/0108129. Bibcode:2003InMat.154..333I. doi:10.1007/s00222-003-0306-7. MR 2013784. S2CID 7327124.
- Iovita, Adrian; Werner, Annette (2003). "p-adic height pairings on abelian varieties with semistable ordinary reduction". Journal für die reine und angewandte Mathematik. 2003 (564): 181–203. arXiv:math/0209362. doi:10.1515/crll.2003.089. MR 2021039. S2CID 11400391.
- Andreatta, Fabrizio; Iovita, Adrian; Stevens, Glenn (2014). "Overconvergent modular sheaves and modular forms for $\textrm{GL}_{2/F}$". Israel Journal of Mathematics. 201 (1): 299–359. doi:10.1007/s11856-014-1045-8. MR 3265287. S2CID 517699.
- Andreatta, Fabrizio; Iovita, Adrian; Pilloni, Vincent (2015). "p-adic families of Siegel modular cuspforms". Annals of Mathematics. 181 (2): 623–697. arXiv:1212.3812. doi:10.4007/annals.2015.181.2.5. JSTOR 24522945. MR 3275848. S2CID 54623621.
- Andreatta, Fabrizio; Iovita, Adrian; Pilloni, Vincent (2016). "On overconvergent Hilbert modular cusp forms" (PDF). Astérisque. 382: 163–193. MR 3581177.
- Andreatta, Fabrizio; Iovita, Adrian; Pilloni, Vincent (2018). "Le halo spectral". Annales Scientifiques de l'École Normale Supérieure. 51 (3): 603–655. doi:10.24033/asens.2362. hdl:11577/3287053. MR 3831033.
