= Glenn H. Stevens =

American mathematician

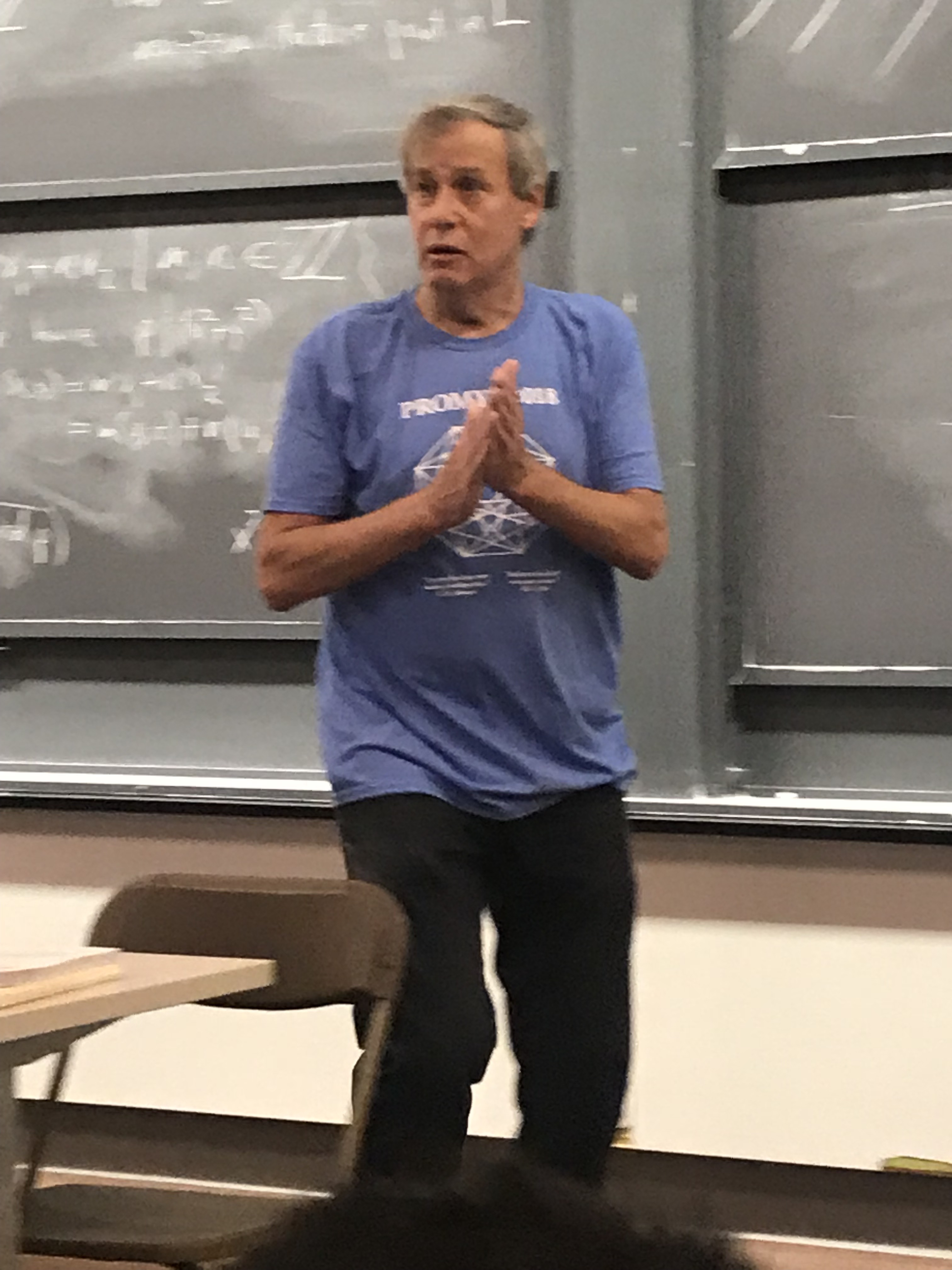
- Born: November 20, 1953 (age 72); Bakersfield, California, US
- Education: Harvard University
- Known for: Number theory Automorphic forms Arithmetic geometry Modular curves PROMYS
- Awards: Presidential Scholars Program (2005)
- Scientific career
- Fields: Mathematics
- Workplaces: Boston University
- Doctoral advisor: Barry Mazur
- Doctoral students: Adrian Iovita

Glenn Howard Stevens (born November 20, 1953) is an American mathematician and educator. He is Professor of Mathematics at Boston University where he has taught and conducted research since 1984.

== Life ==
As a high school student, Stevens was a student of the Ross Program, an experience which would later lead him to found the PROMYS program along with fellow Ross alumni Marjory Baruch, David Fried, and Steve Rosenberg. Stevens earned his Ph.D. in Mathematics from Harvard University in 1981; his thesis advisor was Barry Mazur and the subject of his thesis was the special values of L-functions.

== Work ==
Stevens’ research specialties are number theory, automorphic forms, and arithmetic geometry. He has authored or edited several books, including an exposition on Fermat's Last Theorem as well as a textbook about arithmetic on modular curves.

== Awards and honors ==
A conference called Glennfest was held in honor of Stevens' 60th birthday on June 2–6, 2014. The theme of the conference was p-adic variation in number theory.

In 2015 he was elected as a fellow of the American Mathematical Society "for contributions to the theory of p-adic modular forms and for service to the mathematical community."
