= Jeffrey Hoffstein =

American mathematician

Jeffrey Ezra Hoffstein
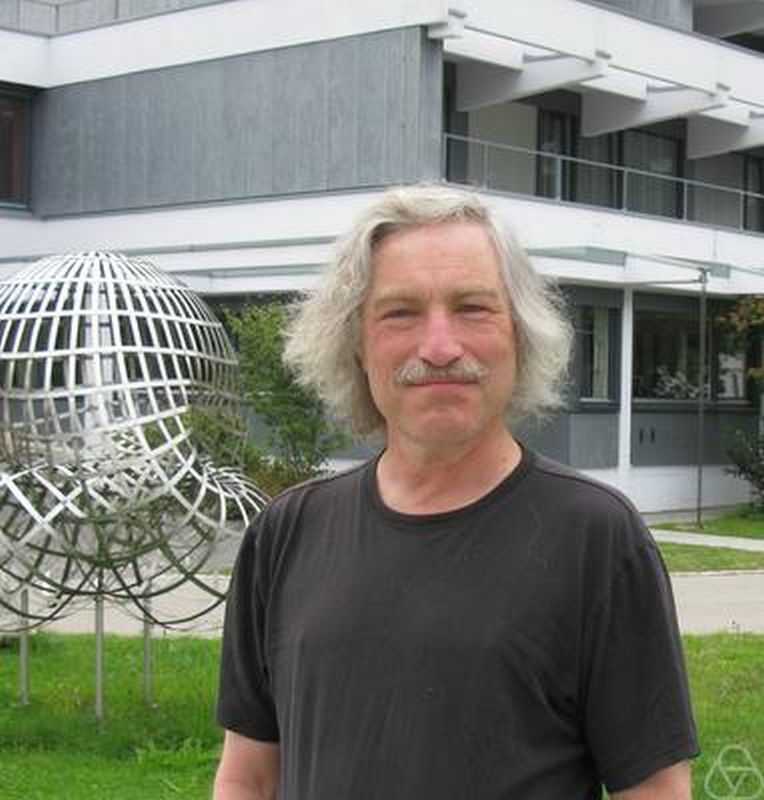
- Born: November 28, 1953 (age 72); New York City

Academic background
- Education: Cornell University (B.A.); MIT (Ph.D.)

Jeffrey Ezra Hoffstein (born September 28, 1953 in New York City) is an American mathematician, specializing in number theory, automorphic forms, and cryptography.

== Education and career ==
Hoffstein graduated with a bachelor's degree in 1974 from Cornell University. He received his Ph.D. in 1978 from Massachusetts Institute of Technology with thesis Class numbers of totally complex quadratic extensions of totally real fields under the supervision of Harold Stark. Hoffstein was a postdoc at the Institute for Advanced Study and then at the University of Cambridge. From 1980 to 1982 he was an assistant professor at Brown University. From 1982 he was an assistant professor and then an associate professor at the University of Rochester. Since 1989 he is a full professor at Brown University and he was the chair of the mathematics department from 2009 to 2013 and again from 2019 to 2024.

His research uses analytic and algebraic methods to investigate L-series of automorphic forms over GL(n) and number fields. With co-workers he has developed new techniques for Dirichlet series in several complex variables. He was several times a visiting scholar at the Institute for Advanced Study (1978/79, 1985, 1986/87). At MSRI, in the academic year 1994/95 he initiated seminars on automorphic functions. In 1984 he was a Fulbright Fellow. He was a visiting professor at the University of Texas at Austin in the spring of 1984 and at the University of Göttingen in the fall of 1986. He became a Fellow of the American Mathematical Society in the class of 2019.

In 1996, Hoffstein, along with Jill Pipher, Joseph Silverman, and Daniel Liemann (Hoffstein's former doctoral student), founded NTRU Cryptosystems, Inc. to market their cryptographic algorithms, NTRUEncrypt and NTRUSign. NTRU Cryptosystems was acquired by Security Innovation in 2009.

== Selected publications ==
- with Jill Pipher, Joseph Silverman: An Introduction to Mathematical Cryptography. Springer-Verlag, 2008. 2014, 2nd edition
- Some analytic bounds for zeta functions and class numbers, Inventiones Mathematicae, vol. 55, 1979, pp. 37–47 doi:10.1007/BF02139701
- with Dorian Goldfeld: Eisenstein series of half integral weight and the mean value of real Dirichlet L-series, Inv. Math., vol. 80, 1985, pp. 185–208 doi:10.1007/BF01388603
- with Daniel Bump, Solomon Friedberg: On some applications of automorphic forms to number theory, Bulletin AMS, Band 33, 1996, pp. 157–175, doi:10.1090/S0273-0979-96-00654-4
- with Bump Cubic metaplectic forms on GL(3), Inv. Math., 84, 1986, pp. 481–505 doi:10.1007/BF01388743
- with Bump, D. Ginzburg The symmetric cube, Inv. Math., 125, 1996, pp. 413–449 doi:10.1007/s002220050082
- with Bump, Friedberg Eisenstein series on the metaplectic group and non vanishing theorems for automorphic L-functions and their derivatives, Annals of Mathematics, vol. 131, 1990, pp. 53–127 doi:10.2307/1971508
- with Bump, Friedberg Nonvanishing theorems for L-functions of modular forms and their derivatives, Inv. Math., 102, 1990, 543–618 doi:10.1007/BF01233440
- with Friedberg Nonvanishing theorems for automorphic L-functions on GL(2), Annals of Mathematics, vol. 142, 1995, pp. 385–423 doi:10.2307/2118638
- with P. Lockhart Coefficients of Maass forms and the Siegel zero, Annals of Mathematics, vol. 140, 1994, pp. 161–181 doi:10.2307/2118543
