= NTRUSign =

NTRU public-key cryptography digital signature algorithm

NTRUSign, also known as the NTRU Signature Algorithm, is an NTRU public-key cryptography digital signature algorithm based on the GGH signature scheme. The original version of NTRUSign was Polynomial Authentication and Signature Scheme (PASS), and was published at CrypTEC'99. The improved version of PASS was named as NTRUSign, and was presented at the rump session of Asiacrypt 2001 and published in peer-reviewed form at the RSA Conference 2003. The 2003 publication included parameter recommendations for 80-bit security. A subsequent 2005 publication revised the parameter recommendations for 80-bit security, presented parameters that gave claimed security levels of 112, 128, 160, 192 and 256 bits, and described an algorithm to derive parameter sets at any desired security level. NTRU Cryptosystems, Inc. patented the algorithm, but all those patents have since expired.

NTRUSign involves mapping a message to a random point in 2N-dimensional space, where N is one of the NTRUSign parameters, and solving the closest vector problem in a lattice closely related to the NTRUEncrypt lattice. NTRUSign is claimed to be faster than those algorithms at low security levels, and considerably faster at high security levels. However, analysis had shown that original scheme is insecure and would leak knowledge of private key.

A redesigned pqNTRUSign had been submitted to the NIST Post-Quantum Cryptography Standardization competition. It is based on "hash-and-sign" (contrasting Fiat–Shamir transformation) methodology, and claims to achieve smaller signature size.

NTRUSign is under consideration for standardization by the IEEE P1363 working group.

== Security ==
It was demonstrated in 2000 by Wu, Bao, Ye and Deng that the signature of PASS, the original version of NTRUSign, can be forged easily without knowing the private key. NTRUSign is not a zero-knowledge signature scheme and a transcript of signatures leaks information about the private key, as first observed by Gentry and Szydlo. Nguyen and Regev demonstrated in 2006 that for the original unperturbed NTRUSign parameter sets an attacker can recover the private key with as few as 400 signatures.

The current proposals use perturbations to increase the transcript length required to recover the private key: the signer displaces the point representing the message by a small secret amount before the signature itself is calculated. NTRU claimed that at least 2^{30} signatures are needed, and probably considerably more, before a transcript of perturbed signatures enabled any useful attack. In 2012 an attack on the scheme with perturbations was presented that required a few thousand signatures for standard security parameters.

The pqNTRUSign claims a 128-bit classical and quantum security for their given parameter set.
