= KISS (algorithm) =

KISS (Keep it Simple Stupid) is a family of pseudorandom number generators introduced by George Marsaglia. Starting from 1998 Marsaglia posted on various newsgroups including sci.math, comp.lang.c, comp.lang.fortran and sci.stat.math several versions of the generators. All KISS generators combine three or four independent random number generators with a view to improving the quality of randomness. KISS generators produce 32-bit or 64-bit random integers, from which random floating-point numbers can be constructed if desired. The original 1993 generator is based on the combination of a linear congruential generator and of two linear feedback shift-register generators. It has a period 2^{95}, good speed and good statistical properties; however, it fails the LinearComplexity test in the Crush and BigCrush tests of the TestU01 suite. A newer version from 1999 is based on a linear congruential generator, a 3-shift linear feedback shift-register and two multiply-with-carry generators. It is 10–20% slower than the 1993 version but has a larger period 2^{123} and passes all tests in TestU01. In 2009 Marsaglia presented a version based on 64-bit integers (appropriate for 64-bit processors) which combines a multiply-with-carry generator, a Xorshift generator and a linear congruential generator. It has a period of around 2^{250} (around 10^{75}).
