= Sebastiano Vigna =

Italian professor of computer science

Sebastiano Vigna (born 1967) is a professor of computer science at the University of Milan. He created the xorshift+ and xoroshiro128+ pseudorandom number generators. Xorshift128+ is used in the JavaScript engines of Chrome, Firefox, and Safari. In 1991, he received a laurea in Mathematics and in 1996 a Ph.D. in computer science; both from the University of Milan. He developed UbiCrawler, a web crawler, in a collaboration with others.

He worked extensively on graph algorithms such as HyperBall. He used this algorithm, together with researchers from Facebook and others, to compute the degrees of separation on the global Facebook network, which resulted in an average distance of 4.74.
