= Xorshift =

Class of pseudorandom number generators

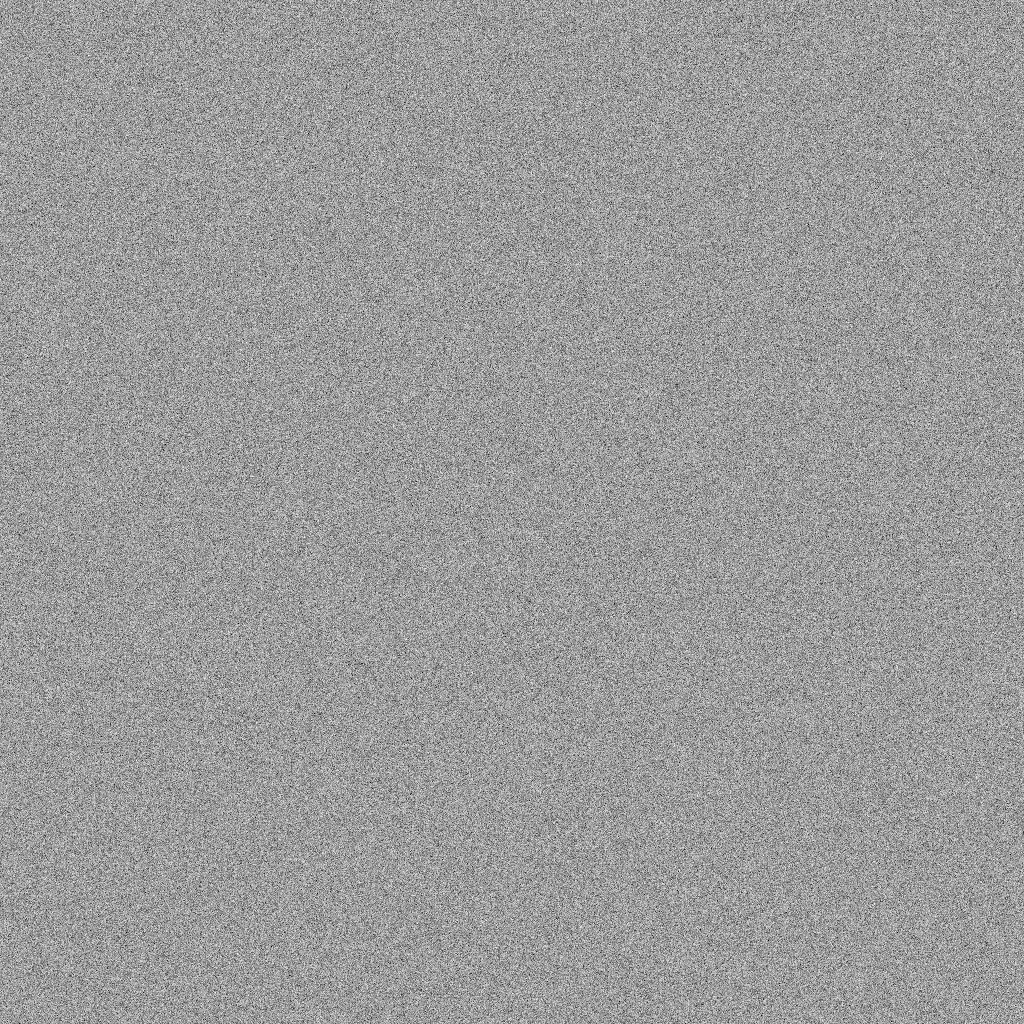
Example random distribution of Xorshift128

Xorshift random number generators, also called shift-register generators, are a class of pseudorandom number generators that were invented by George Marsaglia. They are a subset of linear-feedback shift registers (LFSRs) which allow a particularly efficient implementation in software without the excessive use of sparse polynomials. They generate the next number in their sequence by repeatedly taking the exclusive or of a number with a bit-shifted version of itself. This makes execution extremely efficient on modern computer architectures, but it does not benefit efficiency in a hardware implementation. Like all LFSRs, the parameters have to be chosen very carefully in order to achieve a long period.

For execution in software, xorshift generators are among the fastest PRNGs, requiring very small code and state. However, they do not pass every statistical test without further refinement. This weakness is amended by combining them with a non-linear function, as described in the original paper. Because plain xorshift generators (without a non-linear step) fail some statistical tests, they have been accused of being unreliable.

== Example implementation ==
A C version (Note: In C and most other C-based languages, ^ represents bitwise XOR, and << and >> represent bitwise shifts.) of three xorshift algorithms is given here. The first has one 32-bit word of state, and period 2^{32}−1. The second has one 64-bit word of state and period 2^{64}−1. The last one has four 32-bit words of state, and period 2^{128}−1. The 128-bit algorithm passes the diehard tests. However, it fails the MatrixRank and LinearComp tests of the BigCrush test suite from the TestU01 framework.

All use three shifts and three or four exclusive-or operations:

#include <stdint.h>

typedef struct {
    uint32_t a;
} XorShift32State;

// The state must be initialized to non-zero
uint32_t xorshift32(XorShift32State* state) {
	// Algorithm "xor" from p. 4 of Marsaglia, "Xorshift RNGs"
	uint32_t x = state->a;
	x ^= x << 13;
	x ^= x >> 17;
	x ^= x << 5;
	return state->a = x;
}

typedef struct {
    uint64_t a;
} XorShift64State;

// The state must be initialized to non-zero
uint64_t xorshift64(XorShift64State* state) {
	uint64_t x = state->a;
	x ^= x << 13;
	x ^= x >> 7;
	x ^= x << 17;
	return state->a = x;
}

// XorShift128State can alternatively be defined as a pair
// of uint64_t or a uint128_t where supported
typedef struct {
    uint32_t x[4];
} XorShift128State;

// The state must be initialized to non-zero
uint32_t xorshift128(XorShift128State* state) {
	// Algorithm "xor128" from p. 5 of Marsaglia, "Xorshift RNGs"
	uint32_t t = state->x[3];
    
    uint32_t s = state->x[0]; // Perform a contrived 32-bit shift.
	state->x[3] = state->x[2];
	state->x[2] = state->x[1];
	state->x[1] = s;

	t ^= t << 11;
	t ^= t >> 8;
	return state->x[0] = t ^ s ^ (s >> 19);
}

In case of one 64-bit word of state, there exist parameters which hold period 2^{64}−1 with two pair of exclusive-or and shift.

#include <stdint.h>

typedef struct {
    uint64_t a;
} XorShift64State;

uint64_t xorshift64(XorShift64State* state) {
	uint64_t x = state->a;
	x ^= x << 7;
	x ^= x >> 9;
	return state->a = x;
}

== Non-linear variations ==
All xorshift generators fail some tests in the BigCrush test suite. This is true for all generators based on linear recurrences, such as the Mersenne Twister or WELL. However, it is easy to scramble the output of such generators to improve their quality.

The scramblers known as + and * still leave weakness in the low bits, so they are intended for floating point use, where the lowest bits of floating-point numbers have a smaller impact on the interpreted value. For general purpose, the scrambler ** (pronounced starstar) makes the LFSR generators pass in all bits.

=== xorwow ===
Marsaglia suggested scrambling the output by combining it with a simple additive counter modulo 2^{32} (which he calls a "Weyl sequence" after Weyl's equidistribution theorem). This also increases the period by a factor of 2^{32}, to 2^{192}−2^{32}:

#include <stdint.h>

typedef struct {
    uint32_t x[5];
    uint32_t counter;
} XorWowState;

// The state array must be initialized to not be all zero in the first four words
uint32_t xorwow(XorWowState* state) {
    // Algorithm "xorwow" from p. 5 of Marsaglia, "Xorshift RNGs"
    uint32_t t = state->x[4];
 
    uint32_t s = state->x[0]; // Perform a contrived 32-bit rotate.
    state->x[4] = state->x[3];
    state->x[3] = state->x[2];
    state->x[2] = state->x[1];
    state->x[1] = s;
 
    t ^= t >> 2;
    t ^= t << 1;
    t ^= s ^ (s << 4);
    state->x[0] = t;
    state->counter += 362437;
    return t + state->counter;
}

This performs well, but fails a few tests in BigCrush. This generator is the default in Nvidia's CUDA toolkit.

=== xorshift* ===
A xorshift* generator applies an invertible multiplication (modulo the word size) as a non-linear transformation to the output of a xorshift generator, as suggested by Marsaglia. All xorshift* generators emit a sequence of values that is equidistributed in the maximum possible dimension (except that they will never output zero for 16 calls, i.e. 128 bytes, in a row).

The following 64-bit generator has a maximal period of 2^{64}−1.

#include <stdint.h>

// xorshift64s, variant A_1(12,25,27) with multiplier M_32 from line 3 of table 5
uint64_t xorshift64star(void) {
    // initial seed must be nonzero, don't use a static variable for the state if multithreaded
    static uint64_t x = 1;
    x ^= x >> 12;
    x ^= x << 25;
    x ^= x >> 27;
    return x * 0x2545F4914F6CDD1DULL;
}

The generator fails only the MatrixRank test of BigCrush, however if the generator is modified to return only the high 32 bits, then it passes BigCrush with zero failures. In fact, a reduced version with only 40 bits of internal state passes the suite, suggesting a large safety margin. A similar generator suggested in Numerical Recipes as RanQ1 also fails the BirthdaySpacings test.

Vigna suggests the following xorshift1024* generator with 1024 bits of state and a maximal period of 2^{1024}−1; however, it does not always pass BigCrush. xoshiro256** is therefore a much better option.

#include <stdint.h>

// The state must be seeded so that there is at least one non-zero element in array
typedef struct {
	uint64_t x[16];
	int index;
} XorShift1024sState;

uint64_t xorshift1024s(XorShift1024sState* state) {
	int index = state->index;
	const uint64_t s = state->x[index++];
	uint64_t t = state->x[index &= 15];
	t ^= t << 31; // a
	t ^= t >> 11; // b  -- Again, the shifts and the multipliers are tunable
	t ^= s ^ (s >> 30); // c
	state->x[index] = t;
	state->index = index;
	return t * 1181783497276652981ULL;
}

=== xorshift+ ===
A xorshift+ generator can achieve an order of magnitude fewer failures than Mersenne Twister or WELL. A native C implementation of a xorshift+ generator that passes all tests from the BigCrush suite can typically generate a random number in fewer than 10 clock cycles on x86, thanks to instruction pipelining.

Rather than using multiplication, it is possible to use addition as a faster non-linear transformation. The idea was first proposed by Saito and Matsumoto (also responsible for the Mersenne Twister) in the XSadd generator, which adds two consecutive outputs of an underlying xorshift generator based on 32-bit shifts. However, one disadvantage of adding consecutive outputs is that, while the underlying xorshift128 generator is 2-dimensionally equidistributed, the xorshift128+ generator is only 1-dimensionally equidistributed.

XSadd has some weakness in the low-order bits of its output; it fails several BigCrush tests when the output words are bit-reversed. To correct this problem, Vigna introduced the xorshift+ family, based on 64-bit shifts. xorshift+ generators, even as large as xorshift1024+, exhibit some detectable linearity in the low-order bits of their output; it passes BigCrush, but doesn't when the 32 lowest-order bits are used in reverse order from each 64-bit word. This generator is one of the fastest generators passing BigCrush.

The following xorshift128+ generator uses 128 bits of state and has a maximal period of 2^{128}−1.

#include <stdint.h>

typedef struct {
    uint64_t x[2];
} XorShift128pState;

// The state must be seeded so that it is not all zero
uint64_t xorshift128p(XorShift128pState* state) {
	uint64_t t = state->x[0];
	const uint64_t s = state->x[1];
	state->x[0] = s;
	t ^= t << 23; // a
	t ^= t >> 18; // b -- Again, the shifts and the multipliers are tunable
	t ^= s ^ (s >> 5); // c
	state->x[1] = t;
	return t + s;
}

=== xorshiftr+ ===
xorshiftr+ (r stands for reduced; reads "xorshifter plus") generator was mainly based on xorshift+ yet incorporates modifications making it significantly faster (especially on lightweight devices) and more successful in randomness tests (including TestU01 BigCrush suite) compared to its predecessors. It is one of the fastest generators passing all tests in TestU01's BigCrush suite. Like xorshift+, a native C implementation of a xorshiftr+ generator that passes all tests from the BigCrush suite can typically generate a random number in fewer than 10 clock cycles on x86, thanks to instruction pipelining.

Unlike xorshift+, xorshiftr+ does not return the sum of two variables derived from the state using xorshift-style steps, rather it returns a single variable with the very last operation in its cycle; however, it features an addition just before returning a value, namely in the phase of adjusting the seed for the next cycle; hence the "+" in the name of the algorithm. The variable sizes, including the state, can be increased with no compromise to the randomness scores, but performance drops may be observed on lightweight devices.

The following xorshiftr128+ generator uses 128 bits of state (with two variables) and has a maximal period of 2^{128}−1.

#include <stdint.h>

typedef struct {
    uint64_t s[2]; // seeds
} XorShiftR128PlusState;

// The state must be seeded so that it is not all zero
uint64_t xorshiftr128plus(XorShiftR128PlusState* state) {
	uint64_t x = state->s[0];
	const uint64_t y = state->s[1];
	state->s[0] = y;
	x ^= x << 23; // shift & xor
	x ^= x >> 17; // shift & xor
	x ^= y; // xor
	state->s[1] = x + y;
	return x;
}

== xoshiro ==
xoshiro (short for "xor, shift, rotate") and xoroshiro (short for "xor, rotate, shift, rotate") use rotations in addition to shifts. According to Vigna, they are faster and produce better quality output than xorshift.

This class of generator has variants for 32-bit and 64-bit integer and floating point output; for floating point, one takes the upper 53 bits (for binary64) or the upper 23 bits (for binary32), since the upper bits are of better quality than the lower bits in the floating point generators. The algorithms also include a jump function, which sets the state forward by some number of steps – usually a power of two that allows many threads of execution to start at distinct initial states.

For 32-bit output, xoshiro128** and xoshiro128+ are exactly equivalent to xoshiro256** and xoshiro256+, with uint32_t in place of uint64_t, and with different shift/rotate constants.

More recently, the xoshiro++ generators have been made as an alternative to the xoshiro** generators. They are used in some implementations of Fortran compilers such as GNU Fortran, and in Java, and Julia.

=== xoshiro256++ ===
xoshiro256++ is the family's general-purpose random 64-bit number generator.

// Adapted from the code included on Sebastiano Vigna's website

#include <stdint.h>

uint64_t rol64(uint64_t x, int k) {
	return (x << k) | (x >> (64 - k));
}

typedef struct {
	uint64_t s[4];
} Xoshiro256ppState;

uint64_t xoshiro256pp(Xoshiro256ppState* state) {
	uint64_t* s = state->s;
	const uint64_t result = rol64(s[0] + s[3], 23) + s[0];
	const uint64_t t = s[1] << 17;

	s[2] ^= s[0];
	s[3] ^= s[1];
	s[1] ^= s[2];
	s[0] ^= s[3];

	s[2] ^= t;
	s[3] = rol64(s[3], 45);

	return result;
}

=== xoshiro256** ===
xoshiro256** uses multiplication rather than addition in its output function. It is worth noting, however, that the output function is invertible, allowing the underlying state to be trivially uncovered. It is used in GNU Fortran compiler, Lua (as of Lua 5.4), the .NET framework (as of .NET 6.0), and the random engine class Random\Engine\Xoshiro256StarStar in PHP (as of 8.2).

// Adapted from the code included on Sebastiano Vigna's website

#include <stdint.h>

uint64_t rol64(uint64_t x, int k) {
	return (x << k) | (x >> (64 - k));
}

typedef struct {
	uint64_t s[4];
} Xoshiro256ssState;

uint64_t xoshiro256ss(Xoshiro256ssState* state) {
	uint64_t* s = state->s;
	const uint64_t result = rol64(s[1] * 5, 7) * 9;
	const uint64_t t = s[1] << 17;

	s[2] ^= s[0];
	s[3] ^= s[1];
	s[1] ^= s[2];
	s[0] ^= s[3];

	s[2] ^= t;
	s[3] = rol64(s[3], 45);

	return result;
}

=== xoshiro256+ ===
xoshiro256+ is approximately 15% faster than xoshiro256**, but the lowest three bits have low linear complexity; therefore, it should be used only for floating point results by extracting the upper 53 bits.

#include <stdint.h>

uint64_t rol64(uint64_t x, int k) {
	return (x << k) | (x >> (64 - k));
}

typedef struct {
	uint64_t s[4];
} Xoshiro256pState;

uint64_t xoshiro256p(Xoshiro256pState* state) {
	uint64_t* s = state->s;
	const uint64_t result = s[0] + s[3];
	const uint64_t t = s[1] << 17;

	s[2] ^= s[0];
	s[3] ^= s[1];
	s[1] ^= s[2];
	s[0] ^= s[3];

	s[2] ^= t;
	s[3] = rol64(s[3], 45);

	return result;
}

=== xoroshiro ===
If space is at a premium, xoroshiro128** and xoroshiro128+ are equivalent to xoshiro256** and xoshiro256+. These have smaller state spaces, and thus are less useful for massively parallel programs. xoroshiro128+ also exhibits a mild dependency in the population count, generating a failure after 5 TB of output. The authors do not believe that this can be detected in real world programs. Instead of perpetuating Marsaglia's tradition of xorshift as a basic operation, xoroshiro128+ uses a shift/rotate-based linear transformation designed by Sebastiano Vigna in collaboration with David Blackman. The result is a significant improvement in speed and statistical quality.

xoroshiro64** and xoroshiro64* are equivalent to xoroshiro128** and xoroshiro128+. Unlike the xoshiro generators, they are not straightforward ports of their higher-precision counterparts.

==== Statistical quality ====
The lowest bits of the output generated by xoroshiro128+ have low quality. The authors of xoroshiro128+ acknowledge that it does not pass all statistical tests, stating

This is xoroshiro128+ 1.0, our best and fastest small-state generator for floating-point numbers. We suggest to use its upper bits for floating-point generation, as it is slightly faster than xoroshiro128**. It passes all tests we are aware of except for the four lower bits, which might fail linearity tests (and just those), so if low linear complexity is not considered an issue (as it is usually the case) it can be used to generate 64-bit outputs, too; moreover, this generator has a very mild Hamming-weight dependency making our test (http://prng.di.unimi.it/hwd.php) fail after 5 TB of output; we believe this slight bias cannot affect any application. If you are concerned, use xoroshiro128** or xoshiro256+.

We suggest to use a sign test to extract a random Boolean value, and right shifts to extract subsets of bits.

The state must be seeded so that it is not everywhere zero. If you have a 64-bit seed, we suggest to seed a splitmix64 generator and use its output to fill s.

NOTE: the parameters (a=24, b=16, c=37) of this version give slightly

better results in our test than the 2016 version (a=55, b=14, c=36).

These claims about not passing tests can be confirmed by running PractRand on the input, resulting in output like that shown below:

RNG_test using PractRand version 0.93
RNG = RNG_stdin64, seed = 0xfac83126
test set = normal, folding = standard (64 bit)

rng=RNG_stdin64, seed=0xfac83126
length= 128 megabytes (2^27 bytes), time= 2.1 seconds
  Test Name                         Raw       Processed     Evaluation
  [Low1/64]BRank(12):256(2)         R= +3748  p~=  3e-1129    FAIL !!!!!!!!  
  [Low1/64]BRank(12):384(1)         R= +5405  p~=  3e-1628    FAIL !!!!!!!!  
  ...and 146 test result(s) without anomalies

Acknowledging the authors go on to say:

We suggest to use a sign test to extract a random Boolean value

Thus, programmers should prefer the highest bits (e.g., making a heads/tails by writing random_number < 0 rather than random_number & 1). The same test is failed by some instances of the Mersenne Twister and WELL.

The statistical problems extend far beyond the bottom few bits, because it fails the PractRand test even when truncated and fails multiple tests in BigCrush even when the bits are reversed.

== Initialization ==
In the xoshiro paper, it is recommended to initialize the state of the generators using a generator which is radically different from the initialized generators, as well as one which will never give the "all-zero" state; for shift-register generators, this state is impossible to escape from. The authors specifically recommend using the SplitMix64 generator, from a 64-bit seed. A version of the SplitMix64 generator is used below.

#include <stdint.h>

typedef struct {
	uint64_t s;
} Mix64State;

uint64_t mix64(Mix64State* state) {
	uint64_t result = (state->s += 0x9E3779B97F4A7C15);
	result = (result ^ (result >> 30)) * 0xBF58476D1CE4E5B9;
	result = (result ^ (result >> 27)) * 0x94D049BB133111EB;
	return result ^ (result >> 31);
}

typedef struct {
    uint32_t x[4];
} XorShift128State;

// one could do the same for any of the other generators
void xorshift128_init(XorShift128State* state, uint64_t seed) {
	Mix64State smstate = { seed };

	uint64_t tmp = mix64(&smstate);
	state->x[0] = (uint32_t)tmp;
	state->x[1] = (uint32_t)(tmp >> 32);

	tmp = mix64(&smstate);
	state->x[2] = (uint32_t)tmp;
	state->x[3] = (uint32_t)(tmp >> 32);
}

== See also ==
- List of random number generators
- Linear feedback shift register
