= Spectral test =

Statistical test for linear congruential generators

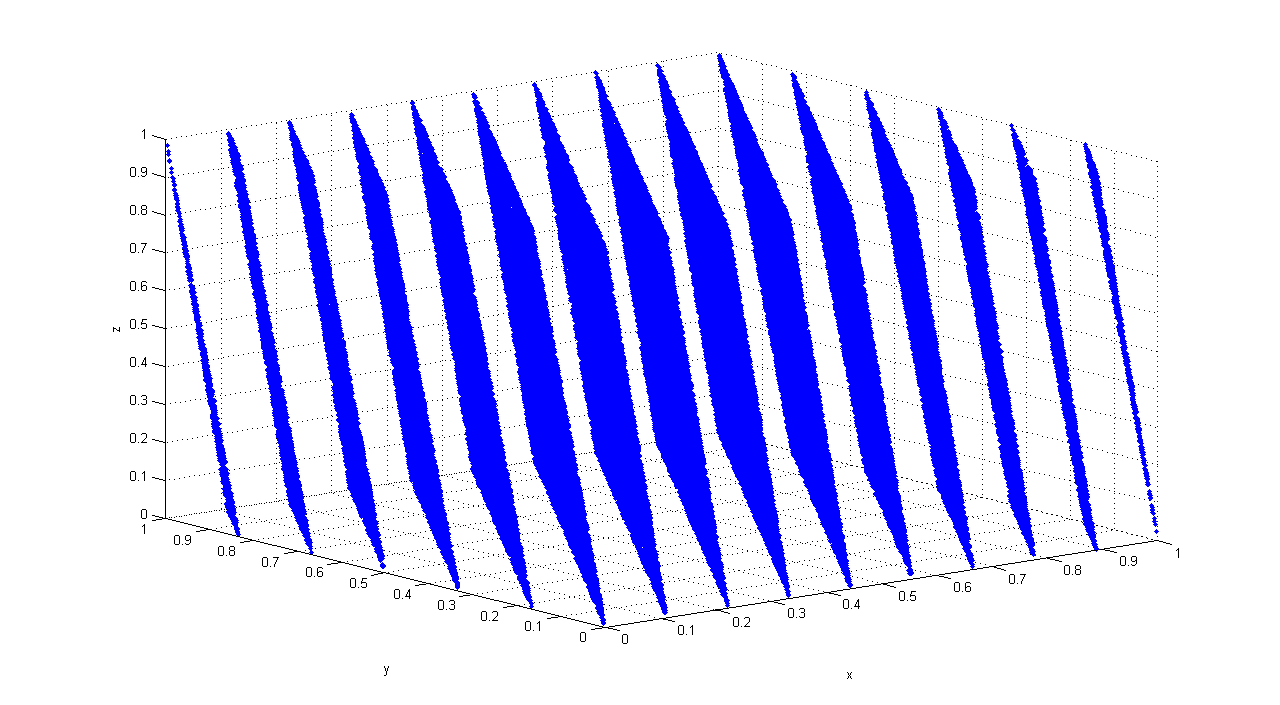
Three-dimensional plot of 100,000 values generated with RANDU. Each point represents 3 consecutive pseudorandom values. It is clearly seen that the points fall in 15 two-dimensional planes.

The spectral test is a statistical test for the quality of a class of pseudorandom number generators (PRNGs), the linear congruential generators (LCGs). LCGs have a property that when plotted in 2 or more dimensions, lines or hyperplanes will form, on which all possible outputs can be found. The spectral test compares the distance between these planes; the further apart they are, the worse the generator is. As this test is devised to study the lattice structures of LCGs, it can not be applied to other families of PRNGs.

According to Donald Knuth, this is by far the most powerful test known, because it can fail LCGs which pass most statistical tests. The IBM subroutine RANDU LCG fails in this test for 3 dimensions and above.

Let the PRNG generate a sequence $u_1, u_2, \dots$. Let $1/\nu_t$ be the maximal separation between covering parallel planes of the sequence $\{(u_{n+1:n+t}) \mid n = 0, 1, \dots\}$. The spectral test checks that the sequence $\nu_2, \nu_3, \nu_4, \dots$ does not decay too quickly.

Knuth recommends checking that each of the following five numbers is larger than 0.01:
$$\begin{aligned}
\mu_2 &=              \pi   \nu_2^2 / m, &
\mu_3 &= \frac{4}{3}  \pi   \nu_3^3 / m, &
\mu_4 &= \frac{1}{2}  \pi^2 \nu_4^4 / m, \\[1ex]
& &
\mu_5 &= \frac{8}{15} \pi^2 \nu_5^5 / m, &
\mu_6 &= \frac{1}{6}  \pi^3 \nu_6^6 / m,
\end{aligned}$$
where $m$ is the modulus of the LCG.

== Figures of merit ==
Knuth defines a figure of merit, which describes how close the separation $1/\nu_t$ is to the theoretical minimum. Under Steele & Vigna's re-notation, for a dimension $d$, the figure $f_d$ is defined as
$$f_d(m, a) = \frac{\nu_d}{\gamma^{1/2}_d \, \sqrt[d]{m}},$$
where $a, m, \nu_d$ are defined as before, and $\gamma_d$ is the Hermite constant of dimension d. $\gamma^{1/2}_d \, \sqrt[d]{m}$ is the smallest possible interplane separation.

L'Ecuyer 1991 further introduces two measures corresponding to the minimum of $f_d$ across a number of dimensions. Again under re-notation, $\mathcal{M}^+_d(m, a)$ is the minimum $f_d$ for a LCG from dimensions 2 to $d$, and $\mathcal{M}^*_d(m, a)$ is the same for a multiplicative congruential pseudorandom number generator (MCG), i.e. one where only multiplication is used, or $c = 0$. Steele & Vigna note that $f_d$ is calculated differently in these two cases, necessitating separate values. They further define a "harmonic" weighted average figure of merit, $\mathcal{H}^+_d(m, a)$ (and $\mathcal{H}^*_d(m, a)$).

== Examples ==
A small variant of the infamous RANDU, with $x_{n+1} = 65539 \, x_n \bmod 2^{29}$, has:

d	2	3	4	5	6	7	8
ν^{2}_{d}	536936458	118	116	116	116		
μ_{d}	3.14	10^{−5}	10^{−4}	10^{−3}	0.02		
f_{d} (Note: Calculated using software from Steele & Vigna (2020), program "mspect" (src/spect.cpp, multiplicative mode).)	0.520224	0.018902	0.084143	0.207185	0.368841	0.552205	0.578329

The aggregate figures of merit are: $\mathcal{M}^{*}_8(65539, 2^{29}) = 0.018902$, $\mathcal{H}^{*}_8(65539, 2^{29}) = 0.330886$.

George Marsaglia (1972) considers $x_{n+1} = 69069 \, x_n \bmod 2^{32}$ as "a candidate for the best of all multipliers" because it is easy to remember, and has particularly large spectral test numbers.

d	2	3	4	5	6	7	8
ν^{2}_{d}	4243209856	2072544	52804	6990	242		
μ_{d} (Note: Calculated from ν^{2}_{d} reported by Marsaglia.)	3.10	2.91	3.20	5.01	0.017		
f_{d}	0.462490	0.313127	0.457183	0.552916	0.376706	0.496687	0.685247

The aggregate figures of merit are: $\mathcal{M}^{*}_8(69069, 2^{32}) = 0.313127$, $\mathcal{H}^{*}_8(69069, 2^{32}) = 0.449578$.

Steele & Vigna (2020) provide the multipliers with the highest aggregate figures of merit for many choices of m = 2^{n} and a given bit-length of a. They also provide the individual $f_d$ values and a software package for calculating these values. For example, they report that the best 17-bit a for m = 2^{32} is:

- For an LCG (c ≠ 0), 0x1dab5 (121525). $\mathcal{M}^{+}_8=0.6403$, $\mathcal{H}^{+}_8 = 0.6588$.
- For an MCG (c = 0), 0x1e92d (125229). $\mathcal{M}^{*}_8=0.6623$, $\mathcal{H}^{*}_8 = 0.7497$.

== Additional illustration ==
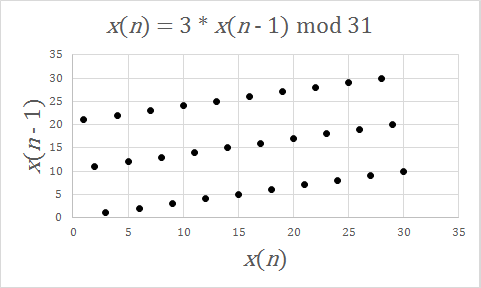
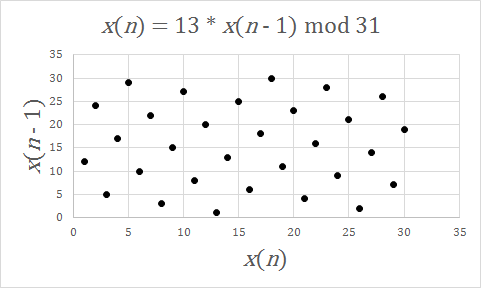
Despite the fact that both relations pass the chi-squared test, the first LCG is less random than the second, as the range of values it can produce by the order it produces them in is less evenly distributed.
