= George Marsaglia =

American mathematician

- Born: March 12, 1924; Denver, Colorado
- Died: February 15, 2011 (aged 86); Tallahassee, Florida
- Education: Colorado State University (BS in physics); Ohio State University (MS and PhD in mathematics)
- Scientific career
- Fields: Mathematics
- Workplaces: Florida State University; Washington State University
- Doctoral advisor: Henry Mann

George Marsaglia (March 12, 1924 – February 15, 2011) was an American mathematician and computer scientist. He is best known for creating the diehard tests, a suite of software for measuring statistical randomness, and xorshift, a shift-register based pseudorandom number generator.

== Research on random numbers ==
Visual demonstration of Marsaglia's theorem

George Marsaglia established the lattice structure of linear congruential generators in the paper "Random numbers fall mainly in the planes", later termed Marsaglia's theorem. This phenomenon means that n-tuples with coordinates obtained from consecutive use of the generator will lie on a small number of equally spaced hyperplanes in n-dimensional space. He also developed the diehard tests, a series of tests to determine whether or not a sequence of numbers have the statistical properties that could be expected from a random sequence. In 1995 he published a CD-ROM of random numbers, which included the diehard tests.

His diehard paper came with the quotation "Nothing is random, only uncertain" attributed to Gail Gasram, though this name is simply the reverse of Marsaglia G, and so likely to be a pseudonym.

He also developed some of the most commonly used methods for generating random numbers and using them to produce random samples from various distributions. Some of the most widely used being the multiply-with-carry, subtract-with-borrow, xorshift, KISS and Mother methods for random numbers, and the ziggurat algorithm for generating normally or other unimodally distributed random variables.

== Life ==
He was Professor Emeritus of Pure and Applied Mathematics and Computer Science at Washington State University and Professor Emeritus of Statistics at Florida State University.

In the 1995 CD-ROM release of diehard, Marsaglia included several papers that outline the process by which the random number files were created. In several places he mentions that, along with deterministic and physical devices:

"Some of the files had white noise combined with black noise, the latter from digital recordings of rap music. And a few of the files even had naked ladies thrown into the mix."

Marsaglia died from a heart attack on February 15, 2011, in Tallahassee.

== See also ==
- Diehard tests
- Linear congruential generator
- Marsaglia polar method
- Multiply-with-carry
- Subtract with carry
- Xorshift
- Ziggurat algorithm
