= Diehard tests =

Battery of statistical tests

The diehard tests are a battery of statistical tests for measuring the quality of a random number generator (RNG). They were developed by George Marsaglia over several years and first published in 1995 on a CD-ROM of random numbers. In 2006, the original diehard tests were extended into the dieharder tests.

== History ==
An initial battery of randomness tests for RNGs was suggested in the 1969 first edition of The Art of Computer Programming by Donald Knuth (Volume 2, Chapter 3.3: Statistical tests). Knuth's tests were then supplanted by George Marsaglia's Diehard tests (1995) consisting of fifteen different tests. The inability to modify the test parameters or add new tests led to the development of the TestU01 library, introduced in 2007 by Pierre L’Ecuyer and Richard Simard of the Université de Montréal.

== Birthday spacings ==
Choose random points on a large interval. The spacings between the points should be asymptotically exponentially distributed. The name is based on the birthday paradox.

Choose m birthdays in a year of n days. List the spacings between the birthdays. If j is the number of values that occur more than once in that list, then j is asymptotically Poisson-distributed with mean m^{3} / (4n). Experience shows n must be quite large, say n ≥ 2^{18}, for comparing the results to the Poisson distribution with that mean. This test uses n = 2^{24} and m = 2^{9}, so that the underlying distribution for j is taken to be Poisson with λ = 2^{27} / 2^{26} = 2. A sample of 500 js is taken, and a chi-square goodness of fit test provides a p value. The first test uses bits 1–24 (counting from the left) from integers in the specified file. Then the file is closed and reopened. Next, bits 2–25 are used to provide birthdays, then 3–26 and so on to bits 9–32. Each set of bits provides a p-value, and the nine p-values provide a sample for a KSTEST.

== Overlapping permutations ==
Analyze sequences of five consecutive random numbers. The 120 possible orderings should occur with statistically equal probability.

This is the OPERM5 test. It looks at a sequence of one million 32-bit random integers. Each set of five consecutive integers can be in one of 120 states, for the 5! possible orderings of five numbers. Thus the 5th, 6th, 7th, ... numbers each provide a state. As many thousands of state transitions are observed, cumulative counts are made of the number of occurrences of each state. Then the quadratic form in the weak inverse of the 120×120 covariance matrix yields a test equivalent to the likelihood ratio test that the 120 cell counts came from the specified (asymptotically) normal distribution with the specified 120×120 covariance matrix (with rank 99). This version uses 1000000 integers, twice. This test may have unresolved bugs resulting in consistently poor p-values.

== Ranks of matrices ==
Select some number of bits from some number of random numbers to form a matrix over {0,1}, then determine the rank of the matrix. Count the ranks.

=== 31×31 ===
The leftmost 31 bits of 31 random integers from the test sequence are used to form a 31×31 binary matrix over the field {0,1}. The rank is determined. That rank can be from 0 to 31, but ranks < 28 are rare, and their counts are pooled with those for rank 28. Ranks are found for 40000 such random matrices and a chi-square test is performed on counts for ranks 31, 30, 29 and ≤ 28.

=== 32×32 ===
A random 32×32 binary matrix is formed, each row a 32-bit random integer. The rank is determined. That rank can be from 0 to 32, ranks less than 29 are rare, and their counts are pooled with those for rank 29. Ranks are found for 40000 such random matrices and a chi square test is performed on counts for ranks 32, 31, 30 and ≤ 29.

=== 6×8 ===
From each of six random 32-bit integers from the generator under test, a specified byte is chosen, and the resulting six bytes form a 6×8 binary matrix whose rank is determined. That rank can be from 0 to 6, but ranks 0, 1, 2, 3 are rare; their counts are pooled with those for rank 4. Ranks are found for 100000 random matrices, and a chi square test is performed on counts for ranks 6, 5 and ≤ 4.

== Monkey tests ==
Treat sequences of some number of bits as "words". Count the overlapping words in a stream. The number of "words" that do not appear should follow a known distribution. The name is based on the infinite monkey theorem.

== Count the 1s ==
Count the 1 bits in each of either successive or chosen bytes. Convert the counts to "letters", and count the occurrences of five-letter "words".

=== Successive bytes ===
Consider the file under test as a stream of bytes (four per 32-bit integer). Each byte can contain from none to eight 1s, with probabilities 1, 8, 28, 56, 70, 56, 28, 8, 1 over 256. Now let the stream of bytes provide a string of overlapping 5-letter words, each "letter" taking values A, B, C, D, E. The letters are determined by the number of 1s in a byte 0, 1, or 2 yield A, 3 yields B, 4 yields C, 5 yields D and 6, 7 or 8 yield E. Thus we have a monkey at a typewriter hitting five keys with various probabilities (37, 56, 70, 56, 37 over 256). There are 5^{5} possible 5-letter words, and from a string of 256000 (overlapping) 5-letter words, counts are made on the frequencies for each word. The quadratic form in the weak inverse of the covariance matrix of the cell counts provides a chisquare test Q5–Q4, the difference of the naive Pearson sums of (OBS-EXP)^{2} / EXP on counts for 5- and 4-letter cell counts.

=== Chosen bytes ===
Consider the file under test as a stream of 32-bit integers. From each integer, a specific byte is chosen, say the leftmost bits 1 to 8. Each byte can contain from 0 to 8 1s, with probabilities 1, 8, 28, 56, 70, 56, 28, 8, 1 over 256. Now let the specified bytes from successive integers provide a string of (overlapping) 5-letter words, each "letter" taking values A, B, C, D, E. The letters are determined by the number of 1s, in that byte 0, 1, or 2 → A, 3 → B, 4 → C, 5 → D, and 6, 7 or 8 → E. Thus we have a monkey at a typewriter hitting five keys with various probabilities 37, 56, 70, 56, 37 over 256. There are 5^{5} possible 5-letter words, and from a string of 256000 (overlapping) 5-letter words, counts are made on the frequencies for each word. The quadratic form in the weak inverse of the covariance matrix of the cell counts provides a chisquare test Q5 – Q4, the difference of the naive Pearson sums of (OBS − EXP)^{2} / EXP on counts for 5- and 4-letter cell counts.

== Parking lot test ==
Randomly place unit circles in a 100×100 square. A circle is successfully parked if it does not overlap an existing successfully parked one. After 12,000 tries, the number of successfully parked circles should follow a certain normal distribution.

In a square of side 100, randomly "park" a car – a circle of radius 1. Then try to park a 2nd, a 3rd, and so on, each time parking "by ear". That is, if an attempt to park a car causes a crash with one already parked, try again at a new random location. (To avoid path problems, consider parking helicopters rather than cars.) Each attempt leads to either a crash or a success, the latter followed by an increment to the list of cars already parked. If we plot n: the number of attempts, versus k the number successfully parked, we get a curve that should be similar to those provided by a perfect random number generator. Theory for the behavior of such a random curve seems beyond reach, and as graphics displays are not available for this battery of tests, a simple characterization of the random experiment is used: k, the number of cars successfully parked after n = 12000 attempts. Simulation shows that k should average 3523 with sigma 21.9 and is very close to normally distributed. Thus (k − 3523) / 21.9 should be a standard normal variable, which, converted to a uniform variable, provides input to a KSTEST based on a sample of 10.

== Minimum distance test ==
Randomly place 8000 points in a 10000×10000 square, then find the minimum distance between the pairs. The square of this distance should be exponentially distributed with a certain mean.

It does this 100 times choose n = 8000 random points in a square of side 10000. Find d, the minimum distance between the (n^{2} − n) / 2 pairs of points. If the points are truly independent uniform, then d^{2}, the square of the minimum distance should be (very close to) exponentially distributed with mean 0.995. Thus 1 − exp(−d^{2} / 0.995) should be uniform on [0,1) and a KSTEST on the resulting 100 values serves as a test of uniformity for random points in the square. Test numbers = 0 mod 5 are printed but the KSTEST is based on the full set of 100 random choices of 8000 points in the 10000×10000 square.

== Random spheres test ==
Randomly choose 4000 points in a cube of edge 1000. Center a sphere on each point, whose radius is the minimum distance to another point. The smallest sphere's volume should be exponentially distributed with a certain mean.

Choose 4000 random points in a cube of edge 1000. At each point, center a sphere large enough to reach the next closest point. Then the volume of the smallest such sphere is (very close to) exponentially distributed with mean 120π / 3. Thus the radius cubed is exponential with mean 30. (The mean is obtained by extensive simulation). The 3D spheres test generates 4000 such spheres 20 times. Each min radius cubed leads to a uniform variable by means of 1 − exp(−r^{3} / 30), then a KSTEST is done on the 20 p-values.

== Squeeze test ==
Multiply 2^{31} by random floats on (0,1) until you reach 1. Repeat this 100000 times. The number of floats needed to reach 1 should follow a certain distribution.

Random integers are floated to get uniforms on [0,1). Starting with k = 2^{31} = 2147483648, the test finds j, the number of iterations necessary to reduce k to 1, using the reduction k = ceiling(k×U), with U provided by floating integers from the file being tested. Such js are found 100000 times, then counts for the number of times j was ≤ 6, 7, ..., 47, ≥ 48 are used to provide a chi-square test for cell frequencies.

== Overlapping sums test ==
Generate a long sequence of random floats on (0,1). Add sequences of 100 consecutive floats. The sums should be normally distributed with characteristic mean and variance.

Integers are floated to get a sequence U(1), U(2), ... of uniform [0,1) variables. Then overlapping sums, S(1) = U(1) + ... + U(100), S(2) = U(2) + ... + U(101), ... are formed. The Ss are virtually normal with a certain covariance matrix. A linear transformation of the Ss converts them to a sequence of independent standard normals, which are converted to uniform variables for a KSTEST. The p-values from ten KSTESTs are given still another KSTEST.

== Wald–Wolfowitz runs test ==
Generate a long sequence of random floats on (0,1). Count ascending and descending runs. The counts should follow a certain distribution.

It counts runs up, and runs down, in a sequence of uniform [0,1) variables, obtained by floating the 32-bit integers in the specified file. This example shows how runs are counted: 0.123, 0.357, 0.789, 0.425, 0.224, 0.416, 0.95 contains an up-run of length 3, a down-run of length 2 and an up-run of (at least) 2, depending on the next values. The covariance matrices for the runs-up and runs-down are well known, leading to chi-square tests for quadratic forms in the weak inverses of the covariance matrices. Runs are counted for sequences of length 10000. This is done ten times. Then repeated.

== Craps test ==
Play 200,000 games of craps, counting the wins and the number of throws per game. Each count should follow a certain distribution.

The number of wins should be (very close to) a normal with mean 200,000p and variance 200,000p(1 − p), with p = 244 / 495. Throws necessary to complete the game can vary from 1 to infinity, but counts for all > 21 are lumped with 21. A chi-square test is made on the no.-of-throws cell counts. Each 32-bit integer from the test file provides the value for the throw of a die, by floating to [0,1), multiplying by 6 and taking 1 plus the integer part of the result.

== Bitstream test ==
The file under test is viewed as a stream of bits. Call them b_{1}, b_{2}, ... . Consider an alphabet with two "letters", 0 and 1, and think of the stream of bits as a succession of 20-letter "words", overlapping. Thus the first word is b_{1}b_{2}...b_{20}, the second is b_{2}b_{3}...b_{21}, and so on. The bitstream test counts the number of missing 20-letter (20-bit) words in a string of 2^{21} overlapping 20-letter words. There are 2^{20} possible 20-letter words. For a truly random string of 2^{21} + 19 bits, the number of missing words j should be (very close to) normally distributed with mean 141,909 and sigma 428. Thus (j−141,909) / 428 should be a standard normal variate (z score) that leads to a uniform [0,1) p value. The test is repeated twenty times.

== OPSO, OQSO and DNA tests ==
OPSO means overlapping-pairs-sparse-occupancy. The OPSO test considers 2-letter words from an alphabet of 1024 letters. Each letter is determined by a specified ten bits from a 32-bit integer in the sequence to be tested. OPSO generates 2^{21}-1 (overlapping) 2-letter words (from 2^{21} "keystrokes") and counts the number of missing words – that is 2-letter words which do not appear in the entire sequence. That count should be very close to normally distributed with mean 141909, sigma 290. Thus (missingwrds-141909) / 290 should be a standard normal variable. The OPSO test takes 32 bits at a time from the test file and uses a designated set of ten consecutive bits. It then restarts the file for the next designated 10 bits, and so on.

OQSO means overlapping-quadruples-sparse-occupancy. The test OQSO is similar, except that it considers 4-letter words from an alphabet of 32 letters, each letter determined by a designated string of 5 consecutive bits from the test file, elements of which are assumed 32-bit random integers. The mean number of missing words in a sequence of 2^{21} four-letter words, (2^{21} + 3 "keystrokes"), is again 141909, with sigma = 295. The mean is based on theory; sigma comes from extensive simulation.

The DNA test considers an alphabet of 4 letters C, G, A, T, determined by two designated bits in the sequence of random integers being tested. It considers 10-letter words, so that as in OPSO and OQSO, there are 2^{20} possible words, and the mean number of missing words from a string of 2^{21} (overlapping) 10-letter words (2^{21} + 9 "keystrokes") is 141909. The standard deviation, sigma = 339, was determined as for OQSO by simulation. The standard deviation for OPSO is 290 to three places, and was determined without simulation.
