= List of random number generators =

Random number generators are important in many kinds of technical applications, including physics, engineering or mathematical computer studies (e.g., Monte Carlo simulations), cryptography and gambling (on game servers).

This list includes many common types, regardless of quality or applicability to a given use case.

== Pseudorandom number generators (PRNGs) ==
The following algorithms are pseudorandom number generators.

Generator	Date	First proponents	References	Notes
Middle-square method	1946	J. von Neumann		In its original form, it is of poor quality and of historical interest only.
Lehmer generator	1951	D. H. Lehmer		One of the earliest and most influential designs.
Linear congruential generator (LCG)	1958	W. E. Thomson; A. Rotenberg		A generalisation of the Lehmer generator. Historically, the most influential and studied generator.
Lagged Fibonacci generator (LFG)	1958	G. J. Mitchell and D. P. Moore		
Linear-feedback shift register (LFSR)	1965	R. C. Tausworthe		A hugely influential design. Also called Tausworthe generators.
Wichmann–Hill generator	1982	B. A. Wichmann and D. I. Hill		A combination of three small LCGs, suited to 16-bit CPUs. Widely used in many programs, e.g. it is used in at least Excel 2003 and 2007 for the Excel function RAND and it was the default generator in the language Python up to version 2.2.
Rule 30	1983	S. Wolfram		Based on cellular automata.
Inversive congruential generator (ICG)	1986	J. Eichenauer and J. Lehn		
Blum Blum Shub	1986	M. Blum, L. Blum and M. Shub		Blum-Blum-Shub is a PRNG algorithm that is considered cryptographically secure. It is based on prime numbers.
Park-Miller generator	1988	S. K. Park and K. W. Miller		A specific implementation of a Lehmer generator, widely used because it is included in C++ as the function minstd_rand0 from C++11 onwards.
ACORN generator	1989 (discovered 1984)	R. S. Wikramaratna		The Additive Congruential Random Number generator. Simple to implement, fast, but not widely known. With appropriate initialisations, passes all current empirical test suites, and is formally proven to converge. Easy to extend for arbitrary period length and improved statistical performance over higher dimensions and with higher precision.
MIXMAX generator	1991	G. K. Savvidy and N. G. Ter-Arutyunyan-Savvidy		It is a member of the class of matrix linear congruential generators, a generalisation of LCGs. The conceptual framework behind the MIXMAX family of generators relies on results from ergodic theory and classical mechanics.
Add-with-carry (AWC)	1991	G. Marsaglia and A. Zaman		A modification of Lagged-Fibonacci generators.
Subtract-with-borrow (SWB)	1991	G. Marsaglia and A. Zaman		A modification of Lagged-Fibonacci generators. A SWB generator is the basis for the RANLUX generator, widely used e.g. for particle physics simulations.
Maximally periodic reciprocals	1992	R. A. J. Matthews		A method with roots in number theory. Never used in practical applications.
KISS	1993	G. Marsaglia		Prototypical example of a combination generator.
Multiply-with-carry (MWC)	1994	G. Marsaglia; C. Koç		
Complementary-multiply-with-carry (CMWC)	1997	R. Couture and P. L’Ecuyer		
Mersenne Twister (MT)	1998	M. Matsumoto and T. Nishimura		Closely related with LFSRs. Its MT19937 implementation is probably the most commonly used modern PRNG. Default generator in R and the Python language starting from version 2.3.
Xorshift	2003	G. Marsaglia		A sub-type of LFSR generators designed to be efficiently implemented in software. Marsaglia also suggested as an improvement the xorwow generator, in which the output of a xorshift generator is added with a Weyl sequence. The xorwow generator is the default generator in the CURAND library of the nVidia CUDA application programming interface for graphics processing units.
Well equidistributed long-period linear (WELL)	2006	F. Panneton, P. L'Ecuyer and M. Matsumoto		A LFSR closely related with Mersenne Twister, aiming at remedying some of its shortcomings.
A small noncryptographic PRNG (JSF)	2007	Bob Jenkins		
Small Fast Chaotic PRNG (SFC)	2010	Chris Doty-Humphrey		
Advanced Randomization System (ARS)	2011	J. Salmon, M. Moraes, R. Dror and D. Shaw		A simplified version of the AES block cipher, leading to very fast performance on systems supporting the AES-NI.
Threefry	2011	J. Salmon, M. Moraes, R. Dror and D. Shaw		A simplified version of the Threefish block cipher, suitable for GPU implementations.
Philox	2011	J. Salmon, M. Moraes, R. Dror and D. Shaw		A simplification and modification of the block cipher Threefish with the addition of an S-box.
WELLDOC	2013	L. Balkova, M. Bucci, A. de Luca, J. Hladky, S. Puzynina		A set of periodic pseudorandom number generators based on infinite words.
SplitMix	2014	G. L. Steele, D. Lea and C. H. Flood		Based upon the final mixing function of MurmurHash3. Included in Java Development Kit 8 and above.
Permuted Congruential Generator (PCG)	2014	M. E. O'Neill		A modification of LCG.
Random Cycle Bit Generator (RCB)	2016	R. Cookman		RCB is described as a bit pattern generator made to overcome some of the shortcomings of the Mersenne Twister and the short periods of shift/modulo generators.
Middle-Square Weyl Sequence RNG (see also middle-square method)	2017	B. Widynski		A variation on John von Neumann's original middle-square method. One of the fastest generators that passes all the tests in BigCrush and PractRand.
xorshiftr+	2018	U. C. Çabuk, Ö. Aydın, and G. Dalkılıç		A modification of xorshift+. Significantly faster than its predecessor and passes all tests in the BigCrush suite.
Xoroshiro128+	2018	D. Blackman, S. Vigna		A modification of Marsaglia's Xorshift generators. One of the fastest generators on modern 64-bit CPUs. Related generators include xoroshiro128**, xoshiro256+ and xoshiro256**.
LXM	2021	G. L. Steele, S. Vigna		Composite generators combining two pseudorandom sub-generators (a linear congruential and an xor-based generator) and a mixing function (the MurmurHash3 function). Several of these generator are implemented as part of Java 17.
64-bit MELG (MELG-64)	2018	S. Harase, T. Kimoto		An implementation of 64-bit maximally equidistributed F_{2}-linear generators with a Mersenne prime period.
Squares RNG	2020	B. Widynski		A counter-based version of Middle-Square Weyl Sequence RNG. Similar to Philox in design but significantly faster.
Collatz-Weyl Generators	2023	Tomasz R. Działa		A class of chaotic counter-based generators applying a broad class of non-invertible generalized Collatz mappings and Weyl sequences, enabling the generation of multiple independent streams. Leveraging 128-bit arithmetic allows for a highly efficient implementation, especially on modern 64-bit architectures.

== Cryptographic algorithms ==
Cipher algorithms and cryptographic hashes can be used as very high-quality pseudorandom number generators. However, generally they are considerably slower (typically by a factor 2–10) than fast, non-cryptographic random number generators.

These include:

- Stream ciphers. Popular choices are Salsa20 or ChaCha (often with the number of rounds reduced to 8 for speed), ISAAC, HC-128 and RC4.
- Block ciphers in counter mode. Common choices are AES (which is very fast on systems supporting it in hardware), TwoFish, Serpent and Camellia.
- Cryptographic hash functions

A few cryptographically secure pseudorandom number generators do not rely on cipher algorithms but try to link mathematically the difficulty of distinguishing their output from a `true' random stream to a computationally difficult problem. These approaches are theoretically important but are too slow to be practical in most applications. They include:

- Blum–Micali algorithm (1984)
- Blum Blum Shub (1986)
- Naor–Reingold pseudorandom function (1997)

== Random number generators that use external entropy ==
These approaches combine a pseudo-random number generator (often in the form of a block or stream cipher) with an external source of randomness (e.g., mouse movements, delay between keyboard presses etc.).

- /dev/random – Unix-like systems
- CryptGenRandom – Microsoft Windows
- Fortuna
- RDRAND instructions (called Intel Secure Key by Intel), available in Intel x86 CPUs since 2012. They use the AES generator built into the CPU, reseeding it periodically.
- Yarrow
- RANDOM.org

== See also ==
- Diceware
- Diehard tests – statistical test suite for random number generators
- Non-uniform random variate generation
- Hardware random number generator
- Random number generator attack
- Randomness
- TestU01 – statistical test suite for random number generators
