= Generalized inversive congruential pseudorandom numbers =

An approach to nonlinear congruential methods of generating uniform pseudorandom numbers in the interval [0,1) is the Inversive congruential generator with prime modulus. A generalization for arbitrary composite moduli $m=p_1,\dots p_r$ with arbitrary distinct primes $p_1,\dots ,p_r \ge 5$ will be present here.

Let $\mathbb{Z}_{m} = \{0,1,...,m-1\}$. For integers $a,b \in \mathbb{Z}_{m}$ with gcd (a,m) = 1 a generalized inversive congruential sequence $(y_{n})_{n \geqslant 0}$ of elements of $\mathbb{Z}_{m}$ is defined by

$$y_{0} = {\rm seed}$$
$$y_{n+1}\equiv a y_{n}^{\varphi(m)-1} + b \pmod m \text{,  }n \geqslant 0$$

where $\varphi(m)=(p_{1}-1)\dots (p_{r}-1)$ denotes the number of positive integers less than m which are relatively prime to m.

== Example ==
Let take m = 15 = $3 \times 5\, a=2 , b=3$ and $y_0= 1$. Hence $\varphi (m)= 2 \times 4=8 \,$ and the sequence $(y_{n})_{n \geqslant 0}=(1,5,13,2,4,7,1,\dots )$ is not maximum.

The result below shows that these sequences are closely related to the following inversive congruential sequence with prime moduli.

For $1\le i \le r$ let $\mathbb{Z}_{p_{i}}= \{0,1,\dots ,p_{i}-1\}, m_{i}= m / p_{i}$ and $a_{i} ,b_{i} \in \mathbb{Z}_{p_{i}}$ be integers with

$$a\equiv m_{i}^{2} a_{i}\pmod {p_{i}} \;\text{and  }\; b\equiv m_{i} b_{i}\pmod {p_{i}} \text{. }$$

Let $(y_{n})_{n \geqslant 0}$ be a sequence of elements of $\mathbb{Z}_{p_{i}}$, given by

$$y_{n+1}^{(i)}\equiv a_{i} (y_{n}^{(i)})^{p_{i}-2} + b_{i} \pmod {p_{i}}\; \text{,  }n \geqslant 0 \;\text {where} \;y_{0}\equiv m_{i} (y_{0}^{(i)})\pmod {p_{i}}\;\text{is assumed. }$$

== Theorem 1 ==
Let $(y_{n}^{(i)})_{n \geqslant 0}$ for $1\le i \le r$ be defined as above. Then

$$y_{n}\equiv m_{1}y_{n}^{(1)}  +  m_{2}y_{n}^{(2)} + \dots + m_{r}y_{n}^{(r)}   \pmod m.$$

This theorem shows that an implementation of Generalized Inversive Congruential Generator is possible, where exact integer computations have to be performed only in $\mathbb{Z}_{p_{1}},\dots , \mathbb{Z}_{p_{r}}$ but not in $\mathbb{Z}_{m}.$

Proof:

First, observe that $m_{i}\equiv 0\pmod {p_{j}}, \; \text {for} \; i\ne j,$ and hence $y_{n}\equiv m_{1}y_{n}^{(1)} + m_{2}y_{n}^{(2)} + \dots + m_{r}y_{n}^{(r)} \pmod m$ if and only if $y_{n}\equiv m_{i} (y_{n}^{(i)})\pmod {p_{i}}$, for $1\le i \le r$ which will be shown on induction on $n \geqslant 0$.

Recall that $y_{0}\equiv m_{i} (y_{0}^{(i)})\pmod {p_{i}}$ is assumed for $1\le i \le r$. Now, suppose that $1\le i \le r$ and $y_{n}\equiv m_{i} (y_{n}^{(i)})\pmod {p_{i}}$ for some integer $n \geqslant 0$. Then straightforward calculations and Fermat's Theorem yield

$$y_{n+1}\equiv a y_{n}^{\varphi(m)-1} + b \equiv m_{i}(a_{i}m_{i}^{\varphi(m)}(y_{n}^{(i)})^{\varphi(m)-1}+ b_{i})\equiv m_{i}(a_{i}(y_{n}^{(i)})^{p_{i}-2} + b_{i})\equiv m_{i}(y_{n+1}^{(i)}) \pmod {p_{i}}$$,

which implies the desired result.

Generalized Inversive Congruential Pseudorandom Numbers are well equidistributed in one dimension. A reliable theoretical approach for assessing their statistical independence properties is based on the discrepancy of s-tuples of pseudorandom numbers.

== Discrepancy bounds of the GIC Generator ==
We use the notation $D_m ^{s}=D_m (x_0,\dots , x_m-1)$ where $x_n=(x_n, x_n+1 ,\dots , x_n+s-1)$ ∈ $[0,1)^s$ of Generalized Inversive Congruential Pseudorandom Numbers for $s\ge 2$.

Higher bound

Let $s\ge 2$
Then the discrepancy $D_m ^s$ satisfies
$D_m$ $^s$ < $m^{-1/2}$ × $( \frac{2}{\pi}$ × $\log m + \frac{7}{5})^s$ × $\textstyle \prod_{i=1}^r (2s-2 + s(p_i)^{-1/2})+ s_{m}^{-1}$ for any Generalized Inversive Congruential operator.

Lower bound:

There exist Generalized Inversive Congruential Generators with
$D_m$ $^s$ ≥ $\frac{1}{2(\pi+2)}$ × $m^{-1/2}$ : × $\textstyle \prod_{i=1}^r (\frac {p_{i} - 3}{p_{i} - 1})^{1/2}$ for all dimension s :≥ 2.

For a fixed number r of prime factors of m, Theorem 2 shows that $D_m^{(s)} = O (m^{-1/2} (\log m )^s)$ for any Generalized Inversive Congruential Sequence. In this case Theorem 3 implies that there exist Generalized Inversive Congruential Generators having a discrepancy $D_m^{(s)}$ which is at least of the order of magnitude $m^{-1/2}$ for all dimension $s\ge 2$. However, if m is composed only of small primes, then r can be of an order of magnitude $(\log m)/\log\log m$ and hence $\textstyle \prod_{i=1}^r (2s-2 + s(p_i)^{-1/2})= O{(m^\epsilon )}$ for every $\epsilon> 0$. Therefore, one obtains in the general case $D_m^{s}=O(m^{-1/2+\epsilon})$ for every $\epsilon> 0$.

Since $\textstyle \prod_{i=1}^r ((p_{i} - 3)/(p_{i} - 1))^{1/2} \geqslant 2^{-r/2}$, similar arguments imply that in the general case the lower bound in Theorem 3 is at least of the order of magnitude $m^{-1/2 - \epsilon}$ for every $\epsilon> 0$. It is this range of magnitudes where one also finds the discrepancy of m independent and uniformly distributed random points which almost always has the order of magnitude $m^{-1/2} (\log\log m)^{1/2}$ according to the law of the iterated logarithm for discrepancies. In this sense, Generalized Inversive Congruential Pseudo-random Numbers model true random numbers very closely.

== See also ==
- Pseudorandom number generator
- List of random number generators
- Linear congruential generator
- Inversive congruential generator
- Naor-Reingold Pseudorandom Function

== Notes ==
- Eichenauer-Herrmann, Jürgen (1994), "On Generalized Inversive Congruential Pseudorandom Numbers", Mathematics of Computation, 63 (207) (first ed.), American Mathematical Society: 293–299, doi:10.1090/S0025-5718-1994-1242056-8, JSTOR 2153575
