= ICG =

ICG may refer to

- ICG Communications
- Illinois Central Gulf Railroad
- Impedance cardiography, a hemorheology technique for detecting the properties of the blood flow in the thorax
- Incitement to commit genocide
- Indian Coast Guard
- Icelandic Coast Guard
- Indocyanine green
- Institute of Cosmology and Gravitation, University of Portsmouth, England
- Intelligence Collection Group, part of the United Kingdom's Defence Intelligence Staff
- ICG plc, a private equity and mezzanine capital firm based in London
- International Children's Games, an International Olympic Committee-sanctioned sport event held every year
- International Coal Group
- International College for Girls, former name of IIS University
- International Crisis Group, a non-profit organisation
- Internet Capital Group
- Inversive congruential generator
- Intra-character gap (or inter-character gap) in American Morse code
- Irish Continental Group, an Irish sea shipping firm
- Independent Comics Group, an imprint of Eclipse Comics
- International Committee on Global Navigation Satellite Systems (ICG) by United Nations Office for Outer Space Affairs
- International Composers' Guild
- International Cinematographers Guild
- Integrated clock gating, in logic chips
