= Barrett reduction =

Algorithm in modular arithmetic

In modular arithmetic, Barrett reduction is an algorithm designed to optimize the calculation of $a \,\bmod\, n \,$ without needing a fast division algorithm. It replaces divisions with multiplications, and can be used when $n$ is constant and $a<n^2$. It was introduced in 1986 by P.D. Barrett.

Historically, for values $a, b < n$, one computed $a b \, \bmod\, n \,$ by applying Barrett reduction to the full product $a b$. In 2021, Becker et al. showed that the full product is unnecessary if we can perform precomputation on one of the operands.

== General idea ==
We call a function $\left[ \, \right]: \mathbb{R} \to \mathbb{Z}$ an integer approximation if $|\left[z\right] - z| \leq 1$. For a modulus $n$ and an integer approximation $\left[\,\right]$, we define $\text{mod}^{\left[\,\right]} \, n: \mathbb{Z} \to (\mathbb{Z}/n\mathbb{Z})$ as

$$a \, \text{mod}^{\left[\,\right]} \, n = a - \left[a / n\right] n$$.

Common choices of $\left[\,\right]$ are floor, ceiling, and rounding functions.

Generally, Barrett multiplication starts by specifying two integer approximations $\left[\,\right]_0, \left[\,\right]_1$ and computes a reasonably close approximation of $ab \, \bmod \, n$ as

$$a b - \left[ \frac{a \, \left[ \frac{b R}{n} \right]_0 }{R} \right]_1 n$$,

where $R$ is a fixed constant, typically a power of 2, chosen so that multiplication and division by $R$ can be performed efficiently.

The case $b = 1$ was introduced by P.D. Barrett for the floor-function case $\left[\,\right]_0 = \left[\,\right]_1 = \lfloor \, \rfloor$. The general case for $b$ can be found in NTL. The integer approximation view and the correspondence between Montgomery multiplication and Barrett multiplication was discovered by Hanno Becker, Vincent Hwang, Matthias J. Kannwischer, Bo-Yin Yang, and Shang-Yi Yang.

== Single-word Barrett reduction ==
Barrett initially considered an integer version of the above algorithm when the values fit into machine words. We illustrate the idea for the floor-function case with $b=1$ and $R=2^k$.

When calculating $a \,\bmod\, n$ for unsigned integers, the obvious analog would be to use division by $n$:

func reduce(a uint) uint {
    q := a / n  // Division implicitly returns the floor of the result.
    return a - q * n
}

However, division can be expensive and, in cryptographic settings, might not be a constant-time instruction on some CPUs, subjecting the operation to a timing attack. Thus Barrett reduction approximates $1/n$ with a value $m/2^k$ because division by $2^k$ is just a right-shift, and so it is cheap.

In order to calculate the best value for $m$ given $2^k$ consider:

$$\frac{m}{2^k} = \frac{1}{n} \;\Longleftrightarrow\; m = \frac{2^k}{n}$$

For $m$ to be an integer, we need to round ${2^k}/{n}$ somehow. Rounding to the nearest integer will give the best approximation but can result in $m/2^k$ being larger than $1/n$, which can cause underflows. Thus $m = \lfloor {2^k}/{n} \rfloor$ is used for unsigned arithmetic.

Thus we can approximate the function above with the following:

func reduce(a uint) uint {
    q := (a * m) >> k // ">> k" denotes bitshift by k.
    return a - q * n
}

However, since $m/2^k \le 1/n$, the value of q in that function can end up being one too small, and thus a is only guaranteed to be within $[0, 2n)$ rather than $[0, n)$ as is generally required. A conditional subtraction will correct this:

func reduce(a uint) uint {
    q := (a * m) >> k
    a := a - q * n
    if a >= n {
        a := a - n
    }
    return a
}

== Single-word Barrett multiplication ==
Suppose $b$ is known. This allows us to precompute $\left\lfloor \frac{b R}{n} \right\rfloor$ before we receive $a$. Barrett multiplication computes $a b$, approximates the high part of $a b$ with $\left\lfloor \frac{a \left\lfloor \frac{b R}{n} \right\rfloor}{R} \right\rfloor \, n$, and subtracts the approximation. Since $\left\lfloor \frac{a \left\lfloor \frac{b R}{n} \right\rfloor}{R} \right\rfloor \, n$ is a multiple of $n$, the resulting value $a b - \left\lfloor \frac{a \left\lfloor \frac{b R}{n} \right\rfloor}{R} \right\rfloor \, n$ is a representative of $a b \, \bmod \, n$.

== Correspondence between Barrett and Montgomery multiplications ==
Recall that unsigned Montgomery multiplication computes a representative of $a b \, \bmod \, n$ as

$$\frac{a \left(b R \, \bmod \, n \right) + \left( a \left( - b R \, \bmod \, n \right) n^{-1} \, \bmod \, R \right) n}{R}$$.

In fact, this value is equal to $a b - \left\lfloor \frac{a \left\lfloor \frac{b R}{n} \right\rfloor}{R} \right\rfloor \, n$.

We prove the claim as follows.

$$\begin{align}
& & &
a b - \left\lfloor \frac{a \left\lfloor \frac{b R}{n} \right\rfloor}{R} \right\rfloor \, n \\
& = & &
a b - \frac{a \left\lfloor \frac{bR}{n} \right\rfloor - \left( a \left\lfloor \frac{bR}{n} \right\rfloor \, \bmod \, R \right) }{R} \, n \\
& = & &
\left( \frac{a b R}{n} - a \left\lfloor \frac{bR}{n} \right\rfloor + \left( a \left\lfloor \frac{bR}{n} \right\rfloor \, \bmod \, R \right) \right) \frac{n}{R} \\
& = & &
\left( \frac{a b R}{n} - a \frac{bR - \left(b R \, \bmod \, n \right)}{n} + \left( a \left\lfloor \frac{bR}{n} \right\rfloor \, \bmod \, R \right) \right) \frac{n}{R} \\
& = & &
\left( \frac{a \left(b R \, \bmod \, n \right)}{n} + \left( a \left\lfloor \frac{bR}{n} \right\rfloor \, \bmod \, R \right) \right) \frac{n}{R} \\
& = & &
\left( \frac{a \left(b R \, \bmod \, n \right)}{n} + \left( a \left( - b R \, \bmod \, n \right) n^{-1} \, \bmod \, R \right) \right) \frac{n}{R} \\
& = & &
\frac{a \left(b R \, \bmod \, n \right) + \left( a \left( - b R \, \bmod \, n \right) n^{-1} \, \bmod \, R \right) n}{R}.
\end{align}$$

Generally, for integer approximations $\left[\,\right]_0, \left[\,\right]_1$, we have

$a b - \left[ \frac{a \, \left[ \frac{b R}{n} \right]_0 }{R} \right]_1 \, n = \frac{a \left( b R \, \text{mod}^{\left[\,\right]_0} \, n \right) + \left( a \left( - b R \, \text{mod}^{\left[\,\right]_0} \, q \right) n^{-1} \, \text{mod}^{\left[\,\right]_1} \, R \right) n}{R}$.

== Range of Barrett multiplication ==
We bound the output with

$$a b - \left\lfloor \frac{a \left\lfloor \frac{b R}{n} \right\rfloor}{R} \right\rfloor \, n
=
\frac{a \left(b R \, \bmod \, n \right) + \left( a \left( - b R \, \bmod \, n \right) n^{-1} \, \bmod \, R \right) n}{R}
\leq
\frac{a n + R n}{R}
=
n \left(1 + \frac{a}{R}\right)$$.

Similar bounds hold for other kinds of integer approximation functions. For example, if we choose $\left[\,\right]_0 = \left[\,\right]_1 = \left\lfloor\,\right\rceil$, the rounding half up function, then we have

$$\left| a b - \left\lfloor \frac{a \left\lfloor \frac{b R}{n} \right\rceil}{R} \right\rceil \, n \right|
=
\left| \frac{a \left(b R \, \text{mod}^{\pm} \, n \right) + \left( a \left( - b R \, \text{mod}^{\pm} \, n \right) n^{-1} \, \text{mod}^{\pm} \, R \right) n}{R}
\right|
\leq
\frac{|a| \frac{n}{2} + \frac{R}{2} n}{R}
=
\frac{n}{2} \left(1 + \frac{|a|}{R} \right).$$

It is common to select R such that $\frac{a}{R}<1$ (or $\frac{\left|a\right|}{R}<1$ in the $\left[\,\right]_{0}=\left[\,\right]_{1}=\left\lfloor \,\right\rceil$ case) so that the output remains within $0$ and $2n$ ($-n$ and $n$ resp.), and therefore only one check is performed to obtain the final result between $0$ and $n$. Furthermore, one can skip the check and perform it once at the end of an algorithm at the expense of larger inputs to the field arithmetic operations.

== Barrett multiplication non-constant operands ==
The Barrett multiplication previously described requires a constant operand b to pre-compute $\left[\frac{bR}{n}\right]_{0}$ ahead of time. Otherwise, the operation is not efficient. It is common to use Montgomery multiplication when both operands are non-constant as it has better performance. However, Montgomery multiplication requires a conversion to and from Montgomery domain which means it is expensive when a few modular multiplications are needed.

To perform Barrett multiplication with non-constant operands, one can set $a$ as the product of the operands and set $b$ to $1$. This leads to

$a-\left[\frac{a\,\left[\frac{R}{n}\right]_{0}}{R}\right]_{1}\,n=\frac{a\left(R\,\text{mod}^{\left[\,\right]_{0}}\,n\right)+\left(a\left(-R\,\text{mod}^{\left[\,\right]_{0}}\,q\right)n^{-1}\,\text{mod}^{\left[\,\right]_{1}}\,R\right)n}{R}$

A quick check on the bounds yield the following in $\left[\,\right]_{0}=\left[\,\right]_{1}=\left\lfloor \,\right\rfloor$ case

$$\begin{align}
a-\left\lfloor \frac{a\,\left\lfloor \frac{R}{n}\right\rfloor }{R}\right\rfloor \,n
&=\frac{a\left(R\,\bmod\,n\right)+\left(a\left(-R\,\bmod\,n\right)n^{-1}\,\bmod\,R\right)n}{R} \\
&\leq\frac{a(R\,\bmod\,n)+Rn}{R}=n\left(1+\frac{a(R\,\bmod\,n)}{Rn}\right)
\end{align}$$

and the following in $\left[\,\right]_{0}=\left[\,\right]_{1}=\left\lfloor \,\right\rceil$ case

$$\begin{align}
\left|a-\left\lfloor \frac{a\left\lfloor \frac{R}{n}\right\rceil }{R}\right\rceil \,n\right|
&=\left|\frac{a\left(R\,\text{mod}^{\pm}\,n\right)+\left(a\left(-R\,\text{mod}^{\pm}\,n\right)n^{-1}\,\text{mod}^{\pm}\,R\right)n}{R}\right|\\
&\leq\frac{|a(R\,\text{mod}^{\pm}\,n)|+\frac{R}{2}n}{R}
=\frac{n}{2}\left(1+\frac{|a(R\,\text{mod}^{\pm}\,n)|}{Rn}\right)
\end{align}$$

Setting $R>|a|$ will always yield one check on the output. However, a tighter constraint on $R$ might be possible since $R\,\text{mod}^{\left[\,\right]_{0}}\,n$ is a constant that is sometimes significantly smaller than $n$.

A small issue arises with performing the following product $a\,\left[\frac{R}{n}\right]_{0}$ since $a$ is already a product of two operands. Assuming $n$ fits in $w$ bits, then $a$ would fit in $2w$ bits and $\left[\frac{R}{n}\right]_{0}$ would fit in $w$ bits. Their product would require a $2w\times w$ multiplication which might require fragmenting in systems that cannot perform the product in one operation.

An alternative approach is to perform the following Barrett reduction:

$$a-\left[\frac{\left[\frac{a}{R_{0}}\right]_{2}\,\left[\frac{R}{n}\right]_{0}}{R_{1}}\right]_{1}\,n
=\frac{
a\left(R\,\text{mod}^{\left[\,\right]_{0}}\,n\right)+
\left(a\,\text{mod}^{\left[\,\right]_{2}}\,R_{0}\right)\left(R-R\,\text{mod}^{\left[\,\right]_{0}}\,n\right) +
\left(\left[\frac{a}{R_{0}}\right]_{2}\,\left[\frac{R}{n}\right]_{0}\,\text{mod}^{\left[\,\right]_{1}}\,R_{1}\right)R_{0}n
}{R}$$

where $R_{0}=2^{k-\beta}$, $R_1=2^{\alpha+\beta}$, $R=R_{0}\cdot R_{1}=2^{k+\alpha}$, and $k$ is the bit-length of $n$.

Bound check in the case $\left[\,\right]_{0}=\left[\,\right]_{1}=\left[\,\right]_{2}=\left\lfloor \,\right\rfloor$ yields the following

$$\begin{align}
a-\left\lfloor \frac{\left\lfloor \frac{a}{R_{0}}\right\rfloor \,\left\lfloor \frac{R}{n}\right\rfloor }{R_{1}}\right\rfloor \,n&\le\frac{a\left(R\,\bmod\,n\right)+R_{0}R-R_{0}\left(R\,\bmod\,n\right)+Rn}{R}\\
&=n\left(1+\frac{a(R\,\bmod\,n)}{Rn}+\frac{R_{0}}{n}-\frac{R\,\bmod\,n}{R_{1}n}\right)
\end{align}$$

and for the case $\left[\,\right]_{0}=\left[\,\right]_{1}=\left[\,\right]_{2}=\left\lfloor \,\right\rceil$ yields the following

$$\begin{align}
\left|a-\left\lfloor \frac{\left\lfloor \frac{a}{R_{0}}\right\rceil \left\lfloor \frac{R}{n}\right\rceil }{R_{1}}\right\rceil \,n\right|
&\le\frac{|a\left(R\,\text{mod}^{\pm}\,n\right)|+R_{0}R/2+R_{0}|(R\,\text{mod}^{\pm}\,n)|/2+Rn/2}{R}\\
&=\frac{n}{2}\left(1+\frac{2|a(R\,\text{mod}^{\pm}\,n)|}{Rn}+\frac{R_{0}}{n}+\frac{|R\,\text{mod}^{\pm}\,n|}{R_{1}n}\right)
\end{align}$$

For any modulus and assuming $|a|<2^{k+\gamma}$, the bound inside the parenthesis in both cases is less than or equal:

$$1+\frac{(2^{k+\gamma})(n)}{(2^{k+\alpha})(n)}+\frac{2^{k-\beta}}{n}+\epsilon\le1+\frac{2^{k+\gamma}}{2^{k+\alpha}}+\frac{2^{k-\beta}}{2^{k-1}}+\epsilon=1+2^{\gamma-\alpha}+2^{1-\beta}+\epsilon$$

where $\epsilon=-\frac{1}{R_{1}}$ in the $\left\lfloor \,\right\rfloor$ case and $\epsilon=\frac{1}{2R_{1}}$ in the $\left\lfloor \,\right\rceil$ case.

Setting $\beta=2$ and $\alpha=\gamma+1$ (or $\alpha=\gamma+2$ in the $\left\lfloor \,\right\rceil$ case) will always yield one check. In some cases, testing the bounds might yield a lower $\alpha$ and/or $\beta$ values.

== Small Barrett reduction ==
It is possible to perform a Barrett reduction with one less multiplication as follows

$a-\left[\frac{a}{R}\right]_{1}\,n$ where $R=2^{k}$ and $k$ is the bit-length of $n$

Every modulus can be written in the form $n=2^{k}-c=R-c$ for some integer $c$.

$$\begin{align}
a-\left[\frac{a}{R}\right]_{1}\,n&=a-\frac{a-(a\,\text{mod}^{\left[\,\right]_{1}}\,R)}{R}n \\
&=\frac{aR-an+(a\,\text{mod}^{\left[\,\right]_{1}}\,R)n}{R} \\
&=\frac{ac+(a\,\text{mod}^{\left[\,\right]_{1}}\,R)n}{R}\\
&=n\left(\frac{a\,\text{mod}^{\left[\,\right]_{1}}\,R}{R}+\frac{ac}{Rn}\right)\\
&=n\left(\frac{a\,\text{mod}^{\left[\,\right]_{1}}\,R}{R}+\frac{a}{\frac{R^{2}}{c}-R}\right)
\end{align}$$

Therefore, reducing any $a<\frac{R^{2}}{c}-R$ for $\left[\,\right]_{1}=\left\lfloor \,\right\rfloor$ or any $|a|<\left(\frac{R^{2}}{c}-R\right)/\,2$ for $\left[\,\right]_{1}=\left\lfloor \,\right\rceil$ yields one check.

From the analysis of the constraint, it can be observed that the bound of $a$ is larger when $c$ is smaller. In other words, the bound is larger when $n$ is closer to $R$.

== Barrett Division ==
Barrett reduction can be used to compute floor, round or ceil division $\left[\frac{a}{n}\right]$ without performing expensive long division. Furthermore it can be used to compute $\left[\frac{ab}{n}\right]$. After pre-computing the constants, the steps are as follows:

1. Compute the approximate quotient $\tilde{q}=\left[\frac{a\,\left[\frac{bR}{n}\right]_{0}}{R}\right]_{1}$.
2. Compute the Barrett remainder $\tilde{r}=ab-\tilde{q}n$.
3. Compute the quotient error $e=(\tilde{r}-r)/n$ where $r=a\,\text{mod}^{\left[\,\right]}\,n$. This is done by subtracting a multiple of $n$ to $\tilde{r}$ until $r$ is obtained.
4. Compute the quotient $q=\tilde{q}+e$.

If the constraints for the Barrett reduction are chosen such that there is one check, then the absolute value of $e$ in step 3 cannot be more than 1. Using $\left[\,\right]_{0}=\left[\,\right]_{1}=\left\lfloor \,\right\rceil$ and appropriate constraints, the error $e$ can be obtained from the sign of $\tilde{r}$.

== Multi-word Barrett reduction ==
Barrett's primary motivation for considering reduction was the implementation of RSA, where the values in question will almost certainly exceed the size of a machine word. In this situation, Barrett provided an algorithm that approximates the single-word version above but for multi-word values. For details see section 14.3.3 of the Handbook of Applied Cryptography.

== Barrett algorithm for polynomials ==
It is also possible to use Barrett algorithm for polynomial division, by reversing polynomials and using X-adic arithmetic.

== See also ==
- Montgomery reduction is another similar algorithm.

== Sources ==
- Bosselaers, A.; Govaerts, R.; Vandewalle, J. (1993). "Comparison of Three Modular Reduction Functions". In Stinson, Douglas R. (ed.). Advances in Cryptology – Crypto'93. Lecture Notes in Computer Science. Vol. 773. Springer. pp. 175–186. CiteSeerX 10.1.1.40.3779. ISBN 3540483292.
- Hasenplaugh, W.; Gaubatz, G.; Gopal, V. (2007). "Fast Modular Reduction" (PDF). 18th IEEE Symposium on Computer Arithmetic(ARITH'07). pp. 225–229. doi:10.1109/ARITH.2007.18. ISBN 978-0-7695-2854-0. S2CID 14801112.
