= Nym Technologies =

Swiss company

- Developer: Harry Halpin, Claudia Diaz, Jaya Klara Brekke, Mark Sinclair, Ania Piotrowska, Marc Debizet
- Type: Virtual private network (VPN), cryptocurrency wallet
- Launched: March 2025; 1 year ago
- Operating systems: Android, iOS, Linux, macOS, Windows
- Status: Active
- Pricing model: Free
- Website: nym.com

Nym
- Developer: Nym Technologies S.A.
- Written in: Rust
- Operating system: Android, iOS, Linux, macOS, Windows
- License: GNU General Public License
- Website: nym.com
- Repository: github.com/nymtech/nym

Nym Technologies is a Swiss company that provides internet privacy technology utilizing Nym mix network and noise generation networks. Nym offers VPN and blockchain-related software and network services. Its most notable service, NymVPN, advertises itself as a VPN service for privacy and security.

Nym Technologies was formed in Neuchâtel, Switzerland in 2018. NymVPN was in development and testing for several years, with the public release in March 2025. It is cross-platform, free and open source software (FOSS). Developed by computer security researchers, it was presented at conferences such as Chaos Communication Congress, HOPE, and at the Free Software Foundation's LibrePlanet during its alpha-beta development and after its public release. The Nym mixnet technology was also tested at some of these events. NymVPN has undergone security audits by JP Aumasson (2021), Oak Security (2023), Cure53 (2024), and Cryspen. Nym Wallet has also been independently audited (2023).

NymVPN operates separate entry and exit nodes using the AmneziaWG implementation of the WireGuard protocol on its "fast" connection mode and five-hop mixnet on "anonymous" mode and maintains no logs. It supports a command-line interface, split tunneling, custom entry and exit node selection, an internet connection kill switch, zero-knowledge credentials and payments, diskless architecture, IPv6 with leak protection, customizable DNS servers, DNS leak protection, perfect forward secrecy, QUIC, and SOCKS5, and the app's user interface is available in multiple languages. It is written in Rust. Nym announced that it will launch a public bug bounty program to incentivize vulnerability investigation and reporting.

NymVPN payments are accepted in various cryptocurrencies. Nym Technologies offers a crypto wallet, and it incentivizes volunteers running nodes with payments in its NYM token.

As of January 2026 the Nym Technologies advisory board consists of George Danezis, Aggelos Kiayias, Ben Laurie, and Bart Preneel. Additional advisors include Daniel J. Bernstein, Chelsea Manning, Karthikeyan Bhargavan, and Carmela Troncoso. Nym partners with academic organizations such as the Security and Privacy Engineering Laboratory (SPRING) at École Polytechnique Fédérale de Lausanne (EPFL), the Computer Security and Industrial Cryptography (COSIC) research group at KU Leuven, and Cryspen.

Alternative services in the security and privacy focused VPN market include Mullvad, Proton VPN, IVPN, and ultimately Tor VPN when it comes out of beta development and testing. NymVPN exceeds VPN service guidelines recommended by the Electronic Frontier Foundation (EFF) and the Freedom of the Press Foundation.

Disadvantages of the mixnet method include increased bandwidth and server load with consequently greater energy usage. Although connection speeds have increased significantly, there are noticeable latency issues that aren't easily fully resolved and can impact certain users. Unlike some other VPN providers, Nym Tech has not announced specific plans to address post-quantum cryptography but has said it is working on the issue and intends to not rush an implementation prematurely. Mixnet compute paths and nodes could potentially be compromised. NymVPN specifically and mixnets generally are also emerging technologies with shorter windows of time that have undergone testing, and at lesser scale, although Nym undergoes security reviews and is FOSS.

== See also ==
- Anonymous P2P
- Anonymous proxy
- Darknet
- Dark web
- Data security
- Internet privacy
- I2P
- Overlay network
- Privacy by design
- Privacy engineering
- Privacy software
- Proxy server
- Secure by design
