= Nym (mixnet) =

Free and open-source anonymity network

- Developer: Nym Technologies
- Release: December 2019
- Stable release: v2025.2 "Hu" / February 2025
- Preview release: v2025.3 "Ruta" / February 2025
- Written in: Rust
- Operating system: Linux
- Available in: English
- Type: Anonymity
- License: GNU General Public License version 3
- Website: nym.com
- Repository: github.com/nymtech/nym

Nym is an evolving mix network (mixnet), a type of computer network infrastructure for privacy that masks user metadata, separating source and destination IP addresses. It anonymizes various types of communication, including messaging, files transfers, payments transactions, and web browsing on basic websites. The project is built on free and open-source software and is decentralized, maintained by a distributed set of independent nodes worldwide. It is developed by Nym Technologies.

Nym is sometimes compared to anonymity networks such as Tor and I2P, although it differs in some aspects. Unlike these, Nym does not support hidden services (e.g. .onion sites on Tor or eepsites on I2P).

Data packets sent through the Nym mixnet are encrypted in multiple layers and routed through a series of nodes, including an entry gateway, three "mix nodes", and an exit gateway to the internet. To mitigate traffic analysis risks, packets are standardized to a uniform size, mixed with cover traffic, and transmitted with randomized timing to obscure traffic patterns. These methods aim to make it more difficult for adversaries with broad surveillance capabilities to correlate incoming and outgoing data flows.

Users can interact with the network via "NymVPN", a client application, or integrate Nym functionality into third-party applications using its software development kit (SDK).

== History ==
The concept of a mix network (mixnet) was introduced by David Chaum in 1979 and later published in 1981. The cypherpunk movement contributed to the development of mixnets in the 1990s, though their practical applications remained limited, primarily in the form of anonymous remailers. In the 2000s, some anonymous communication networks—most notably Tor—incorporated principles of mixnets, though Tor itself is based on onion routing rather than a mixnet implementation.

The Nym mixnet originates from two Horizon 2020 research projects funded by the European Commission following the revelations on mass internet surveillance by the U.S. and U.K. governments: Panoramix (2015–2019) and NEXTLEAP (2016–2018).

The mixnet originates from academic research, with technologies associated with the project regularly presented at scientific conferences in cybersecurity and cryptography, including USENIX, NDSS, and Privacy Enhancing Technologies Symposium (PETS).

These projects contributed to advancements in mixnet technologies, leading to the foundations of Nym in 2017:

- Harry Halpin, then a computer scientist at INRIA, conceived of the idea after a discussion with Adam Back in 2017 on how to improve online privacy through a decentralized computing network that could take advantage of spare computing power to mix packets.
- Cryptographers Ania Piotrowska and George Danezis of University College London (UCL) introduced the "Loopix" architecture, which influenced Nym. Loopix integrated existing privacy-enhancing techniques to strengthen mixnet properties, including "Sphinx" packet format, cover traffic, exponential mixing delays, a layered network topology, and Poisson-process-based packet transmission.

In 2018, Harry Halpin white-boarded the idea to Moxie Marlinspike and Trevor Perrin of Signal and decided to launch Nym. An alpha version of Nym was presented at the 36th Chaos Communication Congress (36C3) in December 2019. In February 2021, a white paper co-authored by Harry Halpin, Claudia Diaz (KU Leuven), and Aggelos Kiayias provided details on Nym’s technical and operational design.

In 2021, Chelsea Manning, a former U.S. Army intelligence analyst and whistleblower, conducted a security audit of Nym to identify potential vulnerabilities. In January 2022, she joined the Nym development team as a security consultant and public relations advisor.

The launch of the live Nym network took place on April 14, 2022, at Station F in Paris, with Edward Snowden as a keynote speaker. In June 2022, Claudia Diaz, Harry Halpin, and Aggelos Kiayias introduced a reward-sharing scheme designed to incentivize operators within mix networks. As of February 2025, the Nym mixnet remains under active development.

The project continues to be developed in collaboration with research institutions, such as KU Leuven (through the COSIC research group) and EPFL (via the SPRING lab). Several other research teams working on privacy-enhancing technologies, cryptography, and decentralized systems have published research articles covering the Nym mixnet design.

== Stakeholders ==
Nym is structured around a mix network architecture, incorporating three primary roles: users, node operators, and validators. The network operates on an incentive-driven economic model designed to maintain its functionality and decentralization.

- Users send network traffic through Nym to enhance the privacy of their online activities and communications.
- Node operators manage two types of node roles:
  - Gateways act as entry and exit points to the network. They verify whether a user has access credentials and forward packets either to the inner "mix nodes" (entry gateways) or to the internet (exit gateways).
  - Mix nodes, which process traffic by decrypting and mixing packets before forwarding them, ensuring that communication patterns are obfuscated.
- Anyone with technical expertise can download the Nym server software and become an operator, similar to how Tor relays function. A decentralized reward and reputation system is used to monitor operators' with the goal of promoting network stability and efficiency.
- Validators maintain a distributed ledger that stores public information about active nodes and their rewards. They also issue anonymous access credentials using zero-knowledge proofs and digital signatures, allowing users to authenticate without revealing their identity.

A utility token serves two primary purposes:

1. Compensating operators and validators for contributing to network infrastructure, ensuring the network adapts to user demand.
2. Maintaining network quality through:
  - A reputation system that prioritizes high-performance operators based on reliability, speed, and latency.
  - Mitigation of Sybil attacks by making it resource-intensive for malicious entities to gain control over a significant portion of the network.

This architecture is designed to support a decentralized governance model, where incentives align with privacy preservation and network security.

== Technical architecture ==
=== Access control ===
Initial access to the network is managed through anonymous access credentials which usage unlinkable from payment and digital signatures. This cryptographic approach enables users to authenticate their access rights to each node without disclosing any identifiable information, thereby enhancing the network's privacy.

=== Network architecture with dynamic reconfiguration ===
The Nym mixnet consists of a five-layer network architecture, maintained by independent node operators.

- Entry gateways: The first layer consists of entry gateways, which serve as access point to the network. Users can select a gateway based on criteria such as reputation, performance, or geographic location.
- Three layers of mix nodes: The core of the mixnet consists of three layers of mix nodes, structured in a stratified architecture. This design is intended to balance privacy protection, network resilience, and efficiency in maintaining inter-node connections.
- Exit gateways: The final layer consists of exit gateways, which forward traffic to the public internet. Users can select an exit gateway similarly to how they choose an entry one.

The topology of the three mixing layers is updated hourly to improve privacy. Before the start of each epoch:

- A subset of mix nodes is selected to route network traffic, based on a reputation system that evaluates quality of service metrics.
- The selected nodes are then randomly assigned to different layers, reducing the risk of malicious actors strategically positioning themselves within the network to monitor or manipulate traffic.

=== Privacy-preserving mechanisms ===
Nym employs several privacy-enhancing techniques to protect both the content of communications and associated metadata. Metadata can reveal information about user activity and communication patterns, making it a target for traffic analysis and mass surveillance. The mixnet aims to resist global adversaries with significant resources, including those capable of network-wide monitoring, cryptanalysis, advanced statistical analysis, or active participation through malicious nodes.

- Uniform packet size: Messages transmitted through the mixnet are divided into fixed-size packets using the "Sphinx" packet format. Standardizing packet sizes helps prevent traffic correlation attacks based on message length.
- Layered encryption: Similar to onion encryption in Tor, each packet is encapsulated in five layers of encryption. As packets traverse the network, each node decrypts only its assigned layer before forwarding the packet. The final node in the sequence is the only one that knows the ultimate destination of the packet.
- Randomized packet transmission: Packets are emitted by the user at random intervals, following a Poisson process.
- Cover traffic injection: Users generate and send dummy packets to accompany real messages. This prevents adversaries from identifying active communication and makes correlation attacks more difficult.
- Temporal reordering at mix nodes: Following the standard mix network model, each mix node introduces random delays (following an exponential distribution) and reorders packets before forwarding, rather than forwarding them when they become available. This also aims to disrupt timing correlation between packet input and output, making traffic analysis more challenging.

== Cryptographic mechanisms ==
Nym employs open-source cryptographic protocols such as WireGuard and the Noise Protocol Framework to enable secure and anonymous packet transmission. The client establishes a secure communication channel with an entry gateway and then encrypts each packet in five layers—one for the exit gateway, three for the mix nodes, and one for the entry gateway. As the packet traverses the network, each node decrypts only its designated layer, before forwarding it to the next node.

To initiate communication, the client selects an entry gateway and establishes a secure channel using:

- X25519, an Elliptic Curve Diffie-Hellman (ECDH) key exchange protocol, used for confidential key agreement.
- Ed25519, a digital signature scheme, which ensures the authenticity of the connection.

Before transmission, the client encrypts each packet in five successive layers, corresponding to the nodes it will traverse:

- Three mix nodes and exit gateway: A four-layer "Sphinx" packet encryption:
  - Packet headers are encrypted using AES-CTR (stream cipher mode).
  - Packet contents are encrypted using Lioness Wide Block Cipher.
- Entry gateway: The outermost encryption layer is secured using AES-GCM 256-bit for confidentiality and integrity purposes.

According to Nym’s 2025 roadmap, plans exist to integrate post-quantum cryptographic resistance as the development team has proposed replacing the Sphinx packet format with a new, lighter format known as “Outfox”, which is intended to optimize network efficiency while maintaining strong anonymity guarantees.

== Research and Development (R&D) ==
The mixnet originates from academic research, with technologies associated with the project regularly presented at scientific conferences in cybersecurity and cryptography, including USENIX, NDSS, and Privacy Enhancing Technologies Symposium (PETS). The project continues to be developed in collaboration with research institutions, such as KU Leuven (through the COSIC research group) and EPFL (via the SPRING lab). Several other research teams working on privacy-enhancing technologies, cryptography, and decentralized systems have published research articles covering the Nym mixnet design.

The development of Nym is guided by a scientific advisory board and external advisors, comprising researchers and practitioners in computer science, networking, cryptography, and privacy protection. Notable members include:

- Karthikeyan Bhargavan, a former INRIA researcher, known for his contributions to TLS 1.3 and IETF standardization efforts. He was a co-recipient of the Levchin Prize in 2016 for his work on TLS.
- Daniel J. Bernstein, a mathematician and cryptographer affiliated with the University of Illinois Chicago and Ruhr University Bochum. He has contributed to the development of several cryptographic primitives, including X25519, Ed25519, ChaCha20, SipHash, Streamlined NTRU Prime, and Classic McEliece, a post-quantum Key Encapsulation Mechanism (KEM).
- George Danezis, a researcher specializing in anonymous communications and security, affiliated with University College London and the Alan Turing Institute.
- Aggelos Kiayias, a cryptographer and professor at the University of Edinburgh, known for his work on the Cardano blockchain, the Ouroboros proof-of-stake protocol, and electronic voting systems. He was a co-recipient of the Lovelace Medal in 2024.
- Ben Laurie, a founding member of the Apache Software Foundation, contributor to OpenSSL and FreeBSD, and a former associate of WikiLeaks. He was a co-recipient of the Levchin Prize in 2024 for his work on Certificate Transparency.
- Bart Preneel, a cryptographer at KU Leuven, co-designer of cryptographic functions, including the Miyaguchi-Preneel construction, RIPEMD hash function, and the MUGI pseudo-random number generator. He is a former president of the International Association for Cryptologic Research (IACR).
- Carmela Troncoso, a professor of computer security and privacy at EPFL, known for her contributions to privacy-enhancing technologies.

== Practical considerations ==
=== User experience ===
Users can access the Nym mixnet through the "NymVPN" client, which is available with both a graphical interface and a command-line interface, or by integrating the network into third-party applications using software development kits (SDKs). The privacy features of Nym share similarities with Virtual Private Networks (VPNs) and Tor, particularly in masking the user’s IP address and obfuscating their location. Additionally, Nym is designed to conceal metadata, a factor often exploited in mass surveillance and traffic analysis systems.

=== Adoption challenges ===
Independent tests conducted by technology media in 2024–2025 indicate that, in practice, the Nym mixnet introduces noticeable latency, which limits its suitability for real-time applications and mainstream adoption–unlike more widely used privacy-enhancing technologies developed over the past decade, such as Brave for private browsing, Proton Mail for encrypted email, and DuckDuckGo for anonymous search. Mixnets are considered more appropriate for latency-tolerant use cases, such as messaging, emailing, data transfers, batch processing, and IoT applications.

=== Privacy properties ===
While the Nym mixnet aims to offer enhanced privacy features, researchers acknowledge that privacy-enhancing technologies and surveillance methods evolve over time, leading to a continuous adaptation between anonymization techniques and traffic analysis strategies. An emerging technology, mixnets such as Nym have yet to be extensively validated on a large scale.

More specifically, research has identified several potential vulnerabilities in the “Loopix” mixnet architecture, which serves as the foundation for Nym. These concerns include susceptibility to traffic analysis, the possibility for entry gateways to discern user information, the substantial amount of cover traffic required to ensure the claimed privacy properties, and the risks of exposure to malicious service providers, including complete paths being compromised.

=== Security properties ===
The Nym software, which powers the network, is open-source and distributed under the GPLv3 license. Its source code is publicly available on GitHub, allowing for independent review and audits by the security community. Nym has undergone several security audits, including by cryptographer Jean-Philippe Aumasson (2021), Oak Security (2023), Cryspen (2023–2024) and Cure53 (2024). However, it does not currently have a public bug bounty program to encourage the reporting of vulnerabilities.

=== Energy consumption ===
Mix networks enhance user privacy by employing multi-layered encryption and routing data through 5-hop connections. This process introduces additional computational overhead compared to single-hop connections, increasing energy consumption. The generation of cover traffic—artificial packets designed to obfuscate real data flows—further increases data transmission volumes and energy usage. Some analyses suggest that this overhead could be up to ten times greater than that of traditional internet traffic.

== See also ==
- Anonymous P2P
- Crypto-anarchism
- Darknet
- Freedom of information
- Internet censorship circumvention
- Internet privacy
