= Mozilla VPN =

Virtual private network service

- Original authors: Chris More, Ricky Rosario, Tony Murphy
- Developer: Mozilla
- Release: 15 July 2020; 6 years ago

Stable release(s) [±]
- Windows / macOS / Linux: 2.0.3 / 29 January 2021; 5 years ago
- Android: 2.29.0 / 17 June 2025; 16 months ago
- iOS: 2.29.0 / 23 June 2025; 16 months ago
- Written in: C++ (for client), Swift (for iOS), Kotlin (for Android)
- Operating system: Windows 10, Android 8, iOS 14, macOS 10.15, Ubuntu 20.04
- Platform: Mobile app, Desktop application
- Available in: 39 languages
- Type: Virtual private network
- License: Mozilla Public License 2.0
- Website: www.mozilla.org/products/vpn/
- Repository: mozilla-vpn-client

Mozilla VPN is an open-source virtual private network developed by Mozilla. It launched in beta as Firefox Private Network on September 10, 2019, and officially launched on July 15, 2020, as Mozilla VPN.

Mozilla VPN should not be confused with the built-in VPN in Firefox since version 149 released in March 2026, which is free with a monthly data limit of 50 GB but only masks traffic that originates in Firefox unlike Mozilla VPN that protects the entire device.

== History ==
The Firefox Private Network web browser extension beta version was released on September 10, 2019, as part of the relaunch of Mozilla's Test Pilot Program, a program that allowed Firefox users to test experimental new features which had been shuttered in January 2019. The beta of the subscription-based standalone virtual private network for Android, Microsoft Windows, and Chromebook launched on February 19, 2020, with the iOS version following soon after.

Firefox Private Network was rebranded as "Mozilla VPN" on June 18, 2020, and officially launched as Mozilla VPN on July 15, 2020. At launch, Mozilla VPN was available in six countries (the United States, Canada, the United Kingdom, Singapore, Malaysia, and New Zealand) for Windows 10, Android, and iOS (beta). Over time, the service also launched in Germany, France, Italy, Spain, Switzerland, Austria, Belgium, Netherlands, Ireland, Finland, Sweden, Poland, Czechia, Hungary, Romania, Bulgaria, Slovakia, Portugal, Denmark, Croatia, Lithuania, Slovenia, Latvia, Luxembourg, Estonia, Cyprus, and Malta.

== Audits history ==
Cybersecurity firm Cure53 conducted a security audit for Mozilla VPN in August 2020 and identified multiple vulnerabilities, including one critical-severity vulnerability. In March 2021, Cure53 conducted a second security audit, which noted significant improvements since the 2020 audit.

The second audit identified multiple issues, including two medium-severity and one high-severity vulnerability, but concluded that by the time of publication, only one vulnerability remained unresolved, and that it would require "a strong state-funded attacker-model" to be exploitable. Mozilla disclosed most of the vulnerabilities in July 2021 and released the full report by Cure53 in August 2021.

In April 2023, Cure53 conducted a third security audit, the results of which Mozilla disclosed in December that year, along with the full report by Cure53.

== Features ==
Mozilla VPN masks the user's IP address, hiding the user's location data from the websites accessed by the user, and encrypts all network activity. The service allows for up to 5 simultaneous connections, to any of more than 500 servers in 30+ countries, and is available on the mobile operating systems iOS and Android and the desktop operating systems Microsoft Windows, macOS and Linux.

Mozilla VPN's infrastructure is provided by the Swedish Mullvad VPN service, which uses the WireGuard VPN protocol. The VPN software comes with additional features, like recommended server locations, the ability to block ads, block ad trackers and malware, the ability to exclude certain applications from protection, the ability to set multi-hop connections, and to set custom DNS servers.

When used with Firefox and the official extension, Mozilla VPN allows the use of different settings per container as well as bypassing the VPN for specific websites.

== See also ==
- Dynamic Multipoint Virtual Private Network
- Ethernet VPN
- Internet privacy
- Mediated VPN
- Virtual private server
- VPN service
