= PureVPN =

Virtual private network provider

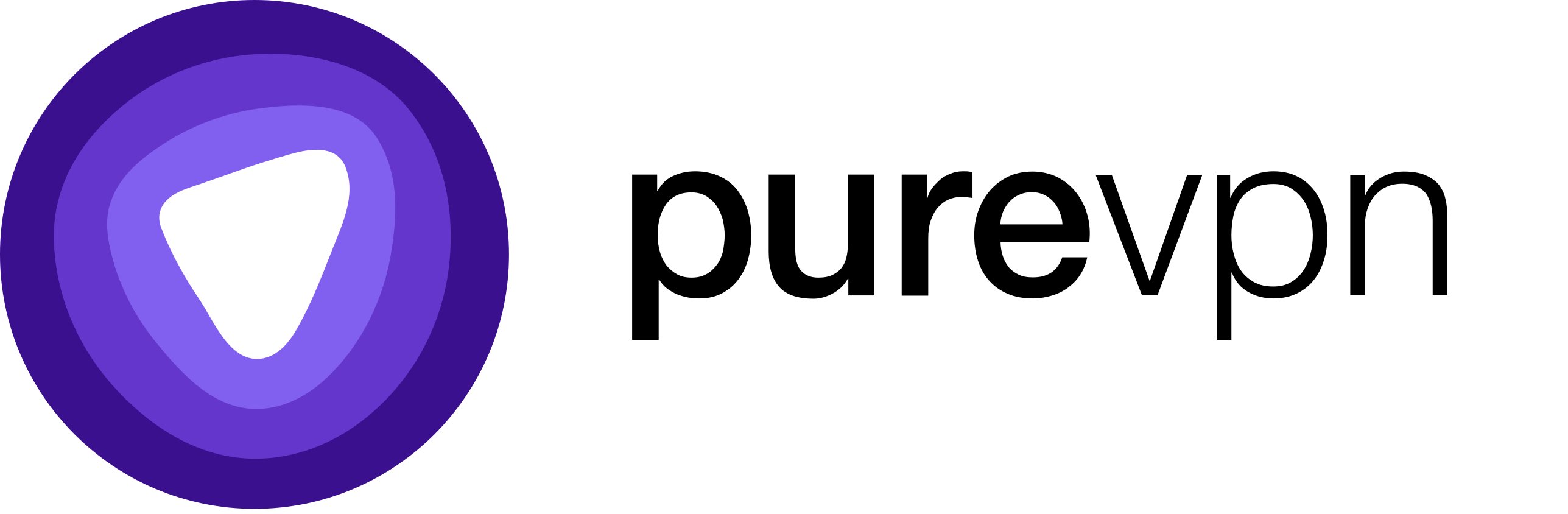
- Logo
- Original author: GZ Systems
- Release: 2007
- Website: www.purevpn.com

PureVPN is a commercial VPN service owned by GZ Systems Ltd. Founded in 2007, the company is based in the British Virgin Islands.

PureVPN allows users to select from four categories: Stream, Internet Freedom, Security/Privacy, and File Sharing. The user's selection then determines which servers through which their traffic will be routed. PureVPN's 6,500 high-speed servers are located in 78 countries. PureVPN requires users to provide their real names to use the service. It stores the day and the Internet service provider through which a user accesses the service but does not store the name of the website or actual time of access.

The service has been criticized for having inconsistent speeds, being unable to access Netflix videos, and having usability problems. It has been praised for its feature set.

== History ==
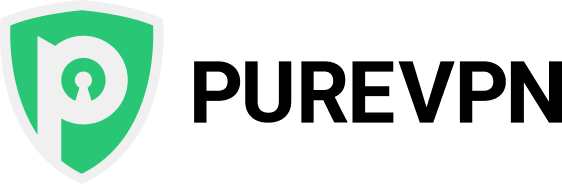
A previous PureVPN logo

PureVPN is owned by GZ Systems Limited, a software company that creates cybersecurity apps. Its mailing address is in Tortola, the British Virgin Islands. PureVPN was co-founded by Uzair Gadit who is based in Pakistan. Founded in 2007, it employs contractors in the United States, United Kingdom, Ukraine, Pakistan, the British Virgin Islands, and formerly Hong Kong.

== Technology ==
PureVPN's homepage allows users to select from four categories: Stream, Internet Freedom, Security/Privacy, and File Sharing. Other configuration options include the transport protocol and split tunneling. PureVPN offers users the option to turn on the "VPN Hotspot", allowing other devices to use the PureVPN hotspot connection. PureVPN provides desktop clients for Linux, macOS, and Microsoft Windows and mobile clients for Android and iOS. PureVPN can be run at the same time on five sessions. It allocated 200 servers for peer-to-peer file sharing and BitTorrent usage but does not provide any servers for accessing the Tor network. PureVPN has over 6,500 high-speed servers across 78 countries.

In August 2021, PureVPN launched its WireGuard protocol, allowing developers to detect bugs and security vulnerabilities. PureVPN partnered in April 2022 with Quantinuum to add a quantum-resistant feature to its OpenVPN protocol.

== Privacy ==
PureVPN stores logs containing information about what Internet service provider a customer used to access it service and which day the service was used. PureVPN does not store the exact time a customer accessed VPN. To prevent misuse and monitor quality, it records how much bandwidth customers are using. PureVPN also stores HTTP cookies for online advertising purposes as well as user account information like email address and credit card data. It does not store what websites a customer is accessing. Brian Nadel of Tom's Guide criticized PureVPN for requiring real names for user signups, even when users employ Bitcoin or gift cards for payment. VPNs largely do not require real names.

Mashable's Charles Poladian praised PureVPN in 2018 when it was based in Hong Kong, which he says has "favorable data laws" and "isn't part of the intelligence-gathering alliance". PC Magazine's Max Eddy said that Hong Kong, as a special administrative regions of China, does not need to follow China's laws but that with China attempting to block VPNs that do not follow its rules, "PureVPN's legal situation is more complicated than that of the average VPN service".

In 2017, PureVPN provided information to Federal Bureau of Investigation agents that helped result in the arrest of a Massachusetts man for cyberstalking. The company concluded that the man had accessed PureVPN through two IP addresses: one from home and one from work. Max Eddy of PC Magazine noted that the company's privacy policy says it will cooperate with investigators who give them a proper warrant and concluded, "In the case of PureVPN, it doesn't appear that the company breached the trust of its users". TechRadar's Mike Williams disagreed, writing that PureVPN "made a big deal of its 'zero log' policy" on its website but did keep logs that enabled investigators to link the man to what he did on the service.

== Reception ==
Mashable's Charles Poladian wrote, "PureVPN works, sometimes even with Netflix, but it has enough issues to keep the VPN from being your go-to choice for private internet access." He criticized PureVPN's erratic speeds, Internet access problems, and inability to overcome Netflix's block of VPNs so that he could watch videos available only in another country. Brian Nadel of Tom's Guide gave VPN a negative review, writing, "its performance was pretty bad in our testing, and we have concerns about the customer service, the real-name policy and the fact that it's essentially based in China". TechRadar's Mike Williams wrote, "PureVPN is loaded with nifty features and we saw decent results on the performance front. It's good value as well, but usability issues with the apps might put you off."

PC Magazine's Max Eddy wrote, "PureVPN is not a bad service by any measure, but it's not the best." He preferred competitor VPNs Private Internet Access, which "offers a spartan experience at an unbeatable price", and NordVPN, which "costs slightly more than average but packs excellent features into an excellent interface". PC World's Ian Paul gave PureVPN a mixed rating, criticizing it for using virtual servers and praising it for having "fine" speeds and having "most of the features you need in a VPN".
