= Private.Me =

private.me
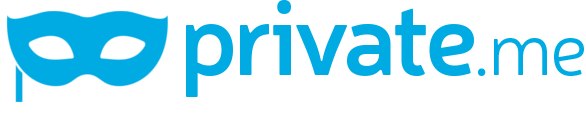
- Type: Private
- Industry: Computer Security, computer software
- Founded: 2014
- Founder: AJ Esmailzadeh
- Headquarters: Los Angeles, California, U.S.
- Key people: AJ Esmailzadeh (President); Robert Neivert (COO); Paul Hershenson; Stan Stahl, PhD (CISO); David Lam (CTO)
- Number of employees: 10+
- Website: https://private.me/

Private.me is a privacy platform designed to keep an individual's personal data private and secure. Using a patent pending system, Private.me has built a confidential web service that allows its users to control who can access their private data. Personal data submitted to Private.me in searches is encrypted and distributed to nonprofit organisations located in different geographical regions.

== Company Profile ==
Private.me uses a process to encrypt and distribute data to the Data Neutrality Administration, a network of privacy nonprofits established with the mission of stewarding user data. This process is called the Dispersed Storage System (DSS). It is accessible via an API and will be offered as a privacy tool. The API requires explicit permission in order to recall a user's data.

The system keeps information inaccessible to any unauthorized entity, including Private.me.

== History ==
Private.me is a data privacy and digital security company which provides web and software applications. It was founded in August 2014 by Standard Clouds, Inc. Private.me was incorporated in California and is headquartered in Los Angeles.
