= Windscribe =

Virtual private network provider

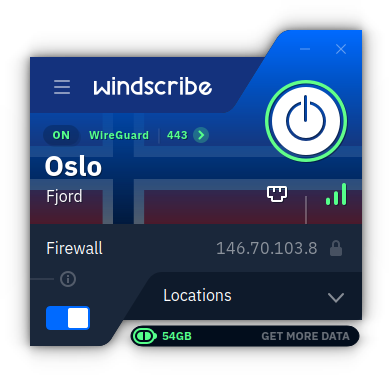
- Desktop client of Windscribe
- Developer: Windscribe Limited
- Initial release: April 20, 2016; 10 years ago
- Operating system: Android; Android TV; Amazon Fire TV; Chrome (browser extension); Firefox (browser extension); Huawei AppGallery; iOS; iPadOS; Linux; macOS; Microsoft Edge (browser extension); Windows; Nvidia Shield TV; Opera (browser extension); Router (OpenVPN/IKEv2/WireGuard configs); tvOS
- Platform: Personal computer; smartphone; router; smart TV
- Type: Virtual private network
- Website: windscribe.com
- Repository: https://github.com/Windscribe

Windscribe is a commercial, cross-platform open source virtual private network (VPN) service provider based in Canada.

== History ==
Windscribe was founded by Yegor Sak and Alex Paguis in 2016.

In January 2021, Windscribe began beta testing ControlD, a DNS-based ad and tracker service. On July 7, 2021, Windscribe self disclosed that two VPN servers hosted in Ukraine were seized by local authorities on June 24, 2021. The disk of the VPN servers contained an OpenVPN private key, which under a set of strict pre-existing conditions could have been used to impersonate a Windscribe VPN server and capture traffic running through it, when OpenVPN protocol is used. There was no impact to users who used the official apps or used other VPN protocols. Only those who used custom OpenVPN configs and were on a network that is under complete control of a hypothetical attacker were potentially vulnerable.

In April 2023, a mid-sized VPN provider WeVPN shut down due to "unforeseen financial difficulties". Windscribe offered to match the remaining time left on WeVPN customer subscriptions, free of charge. Windscribe and WeVPN stated that this is not an acquisition, but "purely a gesture of good will".

In June 2023, Greek authorities started criminal proceedings against Yegor Sak, the CEO of Windscribe, because someone using an IP address that belonged to a Windscribe server in Finland had breached a server in Greece and used it to send mass spam emails. After a two-year process, the case was eventually dismissed in April 2025.

== Features ==
Windscribe uses the OpenVPN, Internet Key Exchange v2/IPsec, and WireGuard protocols in its applications and manual configurations. Windscribe servers support P2P file sharing and is promoted as a no-log VPN service from their privacy policy.

Windscribe offers open source desktop applications for Windows and macOS, with a command-line utility for Linux, and open source mobile applications for iOS, Android, and Android TV. Windscribe also offers encrypted proxy support via browser extensions on Google Chrome and Firefox web browsers. Windscribe users can connect unlimited simultaneous devices.

== Reception ==
In February 2022, Windscribe was named as one of the best VPNs according to Wired UK, stating "Windscribe has always been among the more generous free VPN providers, but it's also one of the most reliable and cost-effective paid-for consumer VPN services."

In May 2023, Windscribe has been named "Best Free VPN of 2023" by Engadget, stating "We selected it as the best free VPN because of its high security and wide range of server options compared to other free VPNs."

=== Ukraine ===
Windscribe has been an active proponent of freedom of access to information censored by authoritarian regimes. These efforts include providing expanded bandwidth free accounts to everyone affected by the Russian invasion of Ukraine, using profanity laden promo codes in both Russian and Ukrainian languages, as well as free and unlimited service to all journalists in the region, and subsequently combating Russian blocks that were aimed to render these efforts fruitless.

== See also ==
- Comparison of virtual private network services
