= IVPN =

Virtual private network provider

- Developer: IVPN Limited
- Type: Virtual private network
- Launched: 2009
- Platforms: Mobile; Desktop; Routers
- Operating systems: Android; iOS; Linux; macOS; Microsoft Windows
- Status: Active
- Pricing model: Standard: $6/mo Plus: $8/mo Pro Suite: $10/mo
- Website: ivpn.net

IVPN is a VPN service offered by IVPN Limited (formerly Privatus Limited) based in Gibraltar. Launched in 2009, IVPN operates using the WireGuard, OpenVPN, and IKEv2 protocols.

== History ==
IVPN has been audited by Cure53, undergoing a logging audit in 2019 and a pentest report in 2020.

In 2024, IVPN acquired Safing, a company that offered a firewall application and the SPN service.

In May 2026, IVPN team announced the introduction of different subscription tiers, some of which include additional services (a customizable DNS filter, email aliasing, a desktop firewall), and a cryptography-based system for user authentication from the clients that does not require the username.

== Privacy ==
IVPN commits to privacy and transparency. For example, it does not require an email address and does not log IP addresses, DNS requests or other connection details. It also accepts anonymous payment methods like Monero and cash.

== See also ==
- Comparison of virtual private network services
- Internet privacy
- Encryption
- Secure communication
