= PrivadoVPN =

Virtual private network provider

- Release: 2019; 7 years ago
- Operating system: Windows; macOS; Linux; Android; iOS
- Platform: Personal computer; Smartphone; Router; Smart TV
- Type: Virtual private network
- Website: privadovpn.com

PrivadoVPN is a VPN service provider with applications for Windows, macOS, Android, iOS, Android TV and Amazon Fire TV along with custom configuration support for routers and Linux. Starting from May 1, 2026 PrivadoVPN is now organized under the laws of Iceland. Previously PrivadoVPN was based in Switzerland and operated under Swiss privacy laws.

== Overview ==
PrivadoVPN has server locations at 60 cities in 49 countries. It has 256-bit-AES encryption, streaming support for all users, kill switch, zero-log guarantee, unlimited speed, SOCKS5 proxy, split tunneling, and 10 simultaneous connections. The VPN offers both free and paid tiers, with users paying to unlock all features.

== Reception ==
In 2021, Paul McNally of PCguide.com wrote: “The Privado[VPN] app has been made deliberately easy to get around and is all the better for that. It’s quite simple to turn it on and never, ever think about it again which is great, and also quite a relief that you can just turn on ‘internet safety’ and forget about it.”

PrivadoVPN was ranked as the #1 free VPN by Security.org and as one of the top 5 VPNs available in 2022 by TechRadar, Tech Advisor, PCMag, Netzwelt, Macworld, and Digital Trends.

The app was praised by Tom's Guide, as they gave PrivadoVPN “full marks across the board,” stating that the VPN offers “an impressive showing for a near-brand new service just beginning to get a foothold in the industry.”

In a review on PCMag, PrivadoVPN was credited with having a generous free plan and affordable paid plans, but that it lacked additional security features and had not yet conducted a third-party audit.

In 2025, the New York Post included PrivadoVPN in its “Ultimate guide to the best VPNs” listing it alongside NordVPN, ExpressVPN, Surfshark and CyberGhost as part of a broader comparison of top VPN services.

== See also ==
- Comparison of virtual private network services
- Encryption
- Internet privacy
- Secure communication
- Virtual private network
