= Mullvad =

Virtual private network provider

Mullvad VPN

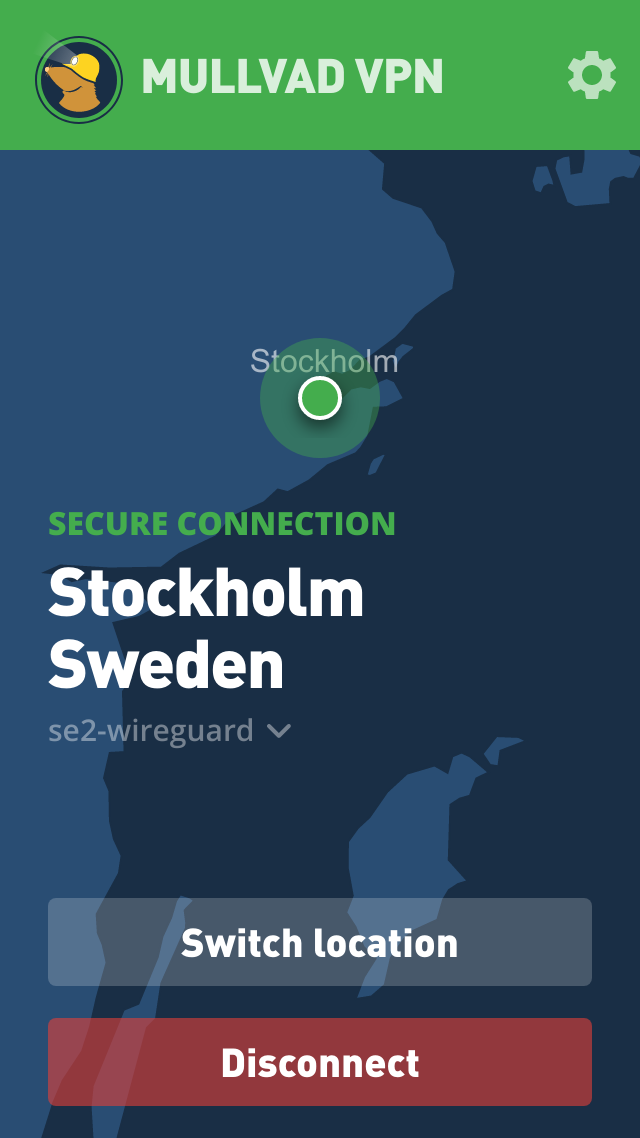
- Desktop client
- Developer: Mullvad VPN AB
- Type: Virtual private network
- Launched: March 2009; 17 years ago
- Platforms: Android, iOS, Linux, macOS, Windows (official app)
- Website: mullvad.net; o54hon2e2vj6c7m3aqqu6uyece65by3vgoxxhlqlsvkmacw6a7m7kiad.onion ^{(Accessing link help)}

Mullvad

Stable release(s)
- Android: android/2026.10 / 17 September 2026
- Linux: 2026.5 / 14 September 2026
- macOS: 2026.5 / 14 September 2026
- Windows: 2026.5 / 14 September 2026
- Website: mullvad.net
- Repository: github.com/mullvad/mullvadvpn-app

Mullvad is a commercial VPN service based in Sweden. The name "Mullvad" is the word for "mole" in the Swedish language. Mullvad operates using the WireGuard protocol. It also supports Shadowsocks as a bridge protocol for censorship circumvention. Mullvad's VPN client software is publicly available under the GPLv3, a free and open-source software license.

== History ==
Mullvad was launched in March 2009 by Amagicom AB in Göteborg, and it had begun by supporting connections via the OpenVPN protocol in 2009. Mullvad was an early adopter and supporter of the WireGuard protocol, announcing the availability of the new VPN protocol in March 2017 and making a "generous donation" supporting WireGuard development between July and December 2017.

In September 2018, the cybersecurity firm Cure53 performed a penetration test on Mullvad's macOS, Windows, and Linux applications. Seven issues were found which were addressed by Mullvad. Cure53 tested only the applications and supporting functions. No assessment was made on the Mullvad server-side and back end.

In October 2019, Mullvad partnered with Mozilla to utilize Mullvad's WireGuard servers for Mozilla VPN.

In April 2020, Mullvad partnered with Malwarebytes and provided WireGuard servers for their VPN service, Malwarebytes Privacy, however since March 2025 they have transitioned over to their own servers based upon their earlier November 2024 AzireVPN acquisition.

In May 2022, Mullvad started officially accepting Monero.

On 18 April 2023, Mullvad's head office in Gothenburg was visited by officers from the National Operations Department of the Swedish Police Authority who had a search warrant to seize computers being used by Mullvad containing customer data. Mullvad demonstrated that in accordance with their policies, no such data existed on their systems. After consulting with the prosecutor, the officers left without seizing any equipment or obtaining customer information. Mullvad had released a public statement in relation to this information in a blog post on their website two days later, also mentioning that it was their first time that their offices had been searched by authorities. In a letter sent to Mullvad nine days after the search, the Swedish Police Authority stated that they had conducted the search at the request of Germany for an ongoing investigation. The investigation involved a blackmail attack that targeted several institutions in the state of Mecklenburg-Western Pomerania which revealed IP addresses that were traced back to Mullvad's VPN service.

On 29 May 2023, Mullvad announced that they would be removing support for port forwarding, effective on 1 July 2023. This was done due to the use of port forwarding for illegal activities, with this causing interference by law enforcement, Mullvad IP addresses getting blacklisted, and hosting providers canceling their services.

== Service ==
A TechRadar review noted in 2019 that "Mullvad's core service is powerful, up-to-date, and absolutely stuffed with high-end technologies". Complementing its use of the open-source OpenVPN and WireGuard protocols, Mullvad includes "industrial strength" encryption (employing AES-256 GCM methodology), 4096-bit RSA certificates with SHA-512 for server authentication, perfect forward secrecy, multiple layers of DNS leak protection, IPv6 leak-protection, and multiple "stealth options" to help bypass government or corporate VPN blocking. Mullvad has over 500 VPN servers in 50 countries.

Mullvad provides VPN client applications for computers running the Linux, macOS, and Windows operating systems. As of April 2020, native Android and iOS Mullvad VPN clients using the WireGuard protocol are available. Android and iOS mobile operating system users can also configure and use built-in VPN clients or the WireGuard app to access Mullvad's service.

== Privacy ==
Providing personal information used to identify users such as email addresses and phone numbers is not required during Mullvad's registration process. Instead, a unique 16-digit account number is anonymously generated for each newly registered user, and this account number is used to log in to the Mullvad on other devices.

For anonymity purposes, Mullvad accepts the anonymous payment methods of cash and Monero. Payment for the service can also be made via bank wire-transfer, credit card, Bitcoin, Bitcoin Cash, PayPal, Swish, EPS Transfer, Bancontact, iDEAL, Przelewy24, and vouchers sold by multiple resellers. Payments made via cryptocurrency have a 10% discount. In June 2022, the service announced that it will no longer offer new recurring subscriptions, as this further reduces the amount of personal information that will have to be stored.

Mullvad does not log VPN users' IP addresses, the VPN IP address used, browsing-activity, bandwidth, connections, session duration, timestamps, and DNS-requests.

Mullvad has many privacy-focused features built into their VPN. Instances include multi-hop, which routes all traffic through an additional Mullvad server before it arrives at its destination, the ability to add a quantum-resistant key exchange to the encryption process, making all data encrypted resistant to quantum computer related attacks, and Defense against AI-guided Traffic Analysis (DAITA), which ensures all packets are the same size and also inserts random network traffic (significantly increasing bandwidth usage), though this is only enabled on select servers.

Mullvad has been actively campaigning against the EU's Regulation to Prevent and Combat Child Sexual Abuse (a.k.a. Chat Control), which would require service providers to scan all users' online communications, even encrypted services, arguing that it would make all methods of online communication viewable and thus not private and not anonymous.

== Reception ==
While Mullvad has been noted for "taking a strong approach to privacy and maintaining good connection speeds", the VPN client setup and interface has been noted as being more onerous and technical than most other VPN providers especially on some client platforms. However, a follow-up review by the same source in October 2018 notes, "Mullvad has a much improved, modern Windows client (and one for Mac, too)". A PC World review, also from October 2018, concludes, "With its commitment to privacy, anonymity (as close as you can realistically get online), and performance Mullvad remains our top recommendation for a VPN service".

In November 2018, TechRadar noted Mullvad VPN as one of five VPN providers to answer a set of questions for trustworthiness verification posed by the Center for Democracy and Technology. In March 2019, a TechRadar review noted slightly substandard speeds. However, a TechRadar review later that year, published on 11 June 2019, stated that Mullvad VPN "speeds are excellent". This is also supported by a 2024 CNET review that demonstrated 13.5% speed loss in March 2024 tests. While the latter review notes a shortcoming for mobile users in that Mullvad had not provided mobile VPN client apps, Mullvad apps for both Android and iOS are now available.

The non-profit Freedom of the Press Foundation, in their "Choosing a VPN" guide, lists Mullvad amongst the five VPNs that meet their recommended features for VPN use as a tool for increasing the privacy of one's online activity.

== Donation to the Örebro Party ==
On June 26, 2026, Swedish left-wing newspaper Flamman reported that founder and co-owner of Mullvad Daniel Berntsson had made a five million Swedish krona (~$500,000 USD) personal donation to the populist Örebro Party. Flamman alleged that Berntsson stated that he felt it was necessary to make a donation as the Örebro Party in his opinion "fights against corruption and dysfunction" and wrote that the donation was made "Because of their spine, their will on focusing on that which is important, their clear-sightedness in the political game as well as to compensate for how they are being worked against in dishonest and illegal ways by the media and other parties." Flamman also alleged he later stated it was sad that the party's remigration policy was necessary. Morgan Finnsiö from the Expo Foundation stated the party was ethnonationalist, and the party has been criticized for its stances on race & immigration by the chief editor of local newspaper Nerikes Allehanda and has been criticized by other politicians for their decorum and use of language in debates.

One day later, Mullvad released a public statement on X.com stating the founders of Mullvad disagree on multiple issues, but that they protect the right of freedom of expression even for those they disagree with, and that Berntsson's private donation was "not part of Mullvad's values or mission, in the same way that someone's opinions on animal rights, taxes or public healthcare isn't." Mullvad offered refunds to people who did not wish to remain customers.

After a Green Party politician criticized the donation and insinuated that the donation came directly from the company, the Örebro Party-leader Markus Allard put out a statement in a post on X.com defending the donation made to his party as a donation made by a private citizen.

Mullvad's other co-CEO Fredrik Strömberg told TechRadar that Mullvad and its related corporate entities played no direct role in supporting the party. He stated he did not like Berntsson's decision to donate, and that many of his colleagues felt the same.

On June 30, 2026, Electromagnetic Field cancelled Mullvad's sponsorship of EMF Camp 2026 citing "recent news" about Mullvad as the reason.

== Other products ==
Mullvad Browser
- Developers: Mullvad VPN and Tor Project
- Stable release: 15.0.16 / 18 June 2026; 4 months ago
- Engine: Gecko
- Operating system: Linux; macOS; Windows
- License: Mozilla Public License
- Website: mullvad.net/browser
- Repository: github.com/mullvad/mullvad-browser

=== Browser ===
On 3 April 2023, Mullvad Browser was released, developed by the Tor Project team and distributed by Mullvad. It has similar privacy and security settings levels to Tor Browser, with an exception being that it operates independently of the Tor network and is meant to be used with a VPN service instead, either Mullvad VPN or another trusted provider. Mullvad Browser has been programmed to minimize the risk of users being tracked and fingerprinted. It attempts to achieve this through several measures:

- Private mode is enabled by default. This means that cookies are never saved between sessions.
- It utilizes Firefox's "resist fingerprinting" feature.
- First-party isolation is in place, in which cookies are placed in separate cookie jars so that trackers cannot connect to each other to build a profile of its user.
- No collection of telemetry data.

=== Search engine ===
On 20 June 2023, Mullvad announced the Mullvad Leta search engine. Mullvad Leta uses the Google Search and Brave Search APIs as a proxy and caches each search for 30 days. When a user inputs a web query, the service checks if it has a cache of the search before making a call to the Google Search or Brave Search API. The service was initially only accessible to devices that had Mullvad VPN turned on, before being opened to the general public on 4 March 2025. Mullvad VPN announced on November 6, 2025, that Mullvad Leta would be shut down on November 27, 2025.

=== Public DNS ===
Mullvad also offers public DNS servers that offer DNS over HTTPS, DNS over TLS, and various content-blocking filters. On the 3 of September 2026, Mullvad announced that it would be shutting down its public encrypted DNS servers by the 2 of November 2026 to instead sponsor Quad9.

== See also ==
- Comparison of virtual private network services
