= Mediated VPN =

A mediated VPN is a virtual private network topology where two or more participants connect to a central switchboard server managed typically by a third party in order to create a virtual private network between them, as distinct from a typical VPN arrangement whereby clients of an organisation connect to a VPN concentrator managed by the same organization.

Typically a switchboard server (referred to as a mediator) will manage several VPNs, identifying each individually by authentication credentials (such as username, network name and passwords). The mediator's role is to assign IP addresses to each participant in a VPN, and to encrypt data through the switchboard server in order to keep it secure from other participants in other VPNs.

== See also ==
- Virtual private network
- Virtual Private LAN Service
- Point-to-point (telecommunications)
