= Smart Sheriff =

South Korean mobile app

Smart Sheriff (Korean: 스마트보안관) is a South Korean parental monitoring mobile app, introduced in 2015. It was developed by Korean app maker MOIBA, and is distributed free, sponsored by the South Korean government, which supported its development. The Korean government required its installation on the smart phones of all users who are under 19 years old, and the app allows the children's parents or guardians to monitor their online activity and block access to various websites. The regulation, passed by the Korea Communications Commission, required compliance from both telecom companies and the public. There was no opt-out provision, the telecom operators have to ensure its installation on all new phones sold to those under 19 years of age and failure to install the app rendered the phone unable to operate.

While the government maintained the app is intended to protect minors from harmful content, the app has been criticized for its invasion of privacy. It has a built-in key logger that will alert parents when children use words from a blacklist, such as rape, kill, pregnancy, suicide, or bully. It also monitors the user's location, usage time, what apps they use (giving the parents remote ability to uninstall them or power down the phone) and what websites they visit. The app has been called spyware by The Register and "a general-purpose spyware juggernaut" by Infosecurity Magazine. Further, critics have pointed out that the app is only available for Android devices, leaving a loophole for users of other platforms, such as Apple iOS. The app also does not work with older Android phones.

An activist organization, Open Net Korea, has called the app the equivalent of installing surveillance cameras in teenagers's phones, without public consultation, and is challenging the regulation in court. There are concerns that introduction of the app for teenagers is only the first step, preparing the ground for introduction of a similar app for adults.

By June 2015 the app had been downloaded about 500,000 times.

It is the first parental control app that has been made a legally required, obligatory install in any country.

In early November 2015, reports of serious security holes caused the Korean government to withdraw its support for the app and instead suggest using alternative services.

== See also ==
- Internet censorship in South Korea
