= TunnelBear =

Virtual private network provider

- TunnelBear connected to a private server in Italy
- Developers: TunnelBear Inc. (2011–2018); McAfee (2018–present)
- Operating system: Android, Windows, macOS, iOS, Linux
- Available in: English
- Type: Virtual Private Network
- License: Subscription business model, with a freeware client app
- Website: tunnelbear.com

TunnelBear is a public VPN service based in Toronto, Canada. It was created by Daniel Kaldor and Ryan Dochuk in 2011. In March 2018, TunnelBear was acquired by McAfee.

== History ==
=== Early history ===
TunnelBear was founded in 2011 by Ryan Dochuk and Daniel Kaldor, and is headquartered in Toronto, Canada.

=== 2018 McAfee acquisition ===
In 2018, TunnelBear was acquired by cybersecurity company McAfee and subsequently fell under U.S. jurisdiction. McAfee intended to combine its own VPN service with TunnelBear's own technologies. At the time of the acquisition, TunnelBear was set to continue using its own brand for products.

=== Anti-censorship efforts ===
During the 2014 Venezuelan Protests, TunnelBear offered free service to users connecting from Venezuela. In response to government censorship in countries like Venezuela—including Iran, Türkiye and Uganda—TunnelBear has offered free or unlimited data to users within such countries.

== Features ==
A freeware TunnelBear client is available on Android, Windows, macOS and iOS. It also has browser extensions for Google Chrome and Opera. Alternatively, Linux distros can be configured to use TunnelBear.

Like other public VPN services, TunnelBear has the ability to bypass content blocking in most countries.

All TunnelBear clients use AES-256 encryption with the exception of the client for iOS 8 and earlier, which uses AES-128. When connected, the user's actual IP address will not be visible to the websites visited. Instead, the websites and/or computers would be able to see the spoofed IP address provided by the service.

TunnelBear was among the first consumer VPNs to conduct and publicly release the results of an independent security audit. They record when their users connect to the service and publish annual reports on the number of times law enforcement has requested user information.

== Reception ==
Scott Gilbertson of Wired praised TunnelBear's “cute bear animations”, saying that they make the service more approachable, and described the provider as having security features comparable to the competition and an easy-to-understand privacy policy. The provider has faced criticism from WireCutter for comparatively slower speeds and dropped video calls in their tests of the service, but WireCutter stated that TunnelBear excels in “usability, trust, and transparency”. Rae Hodge at CNET criticised the service for its limited server locations and the inability for users to pick an individual server within a location. Hodge also raised concerns that Tunnelbear's records could be subpoenaed because they are a Canadian business owned by an American company and does not have a "no logs" promise like many competitors. PCWorld noted that although TunnelBear is simple and approachable, it does not match the speed and range of features offered by some competitors.

== See also ==
- Comparison of virtual private network services
