= George Danezis =

Computer scientist

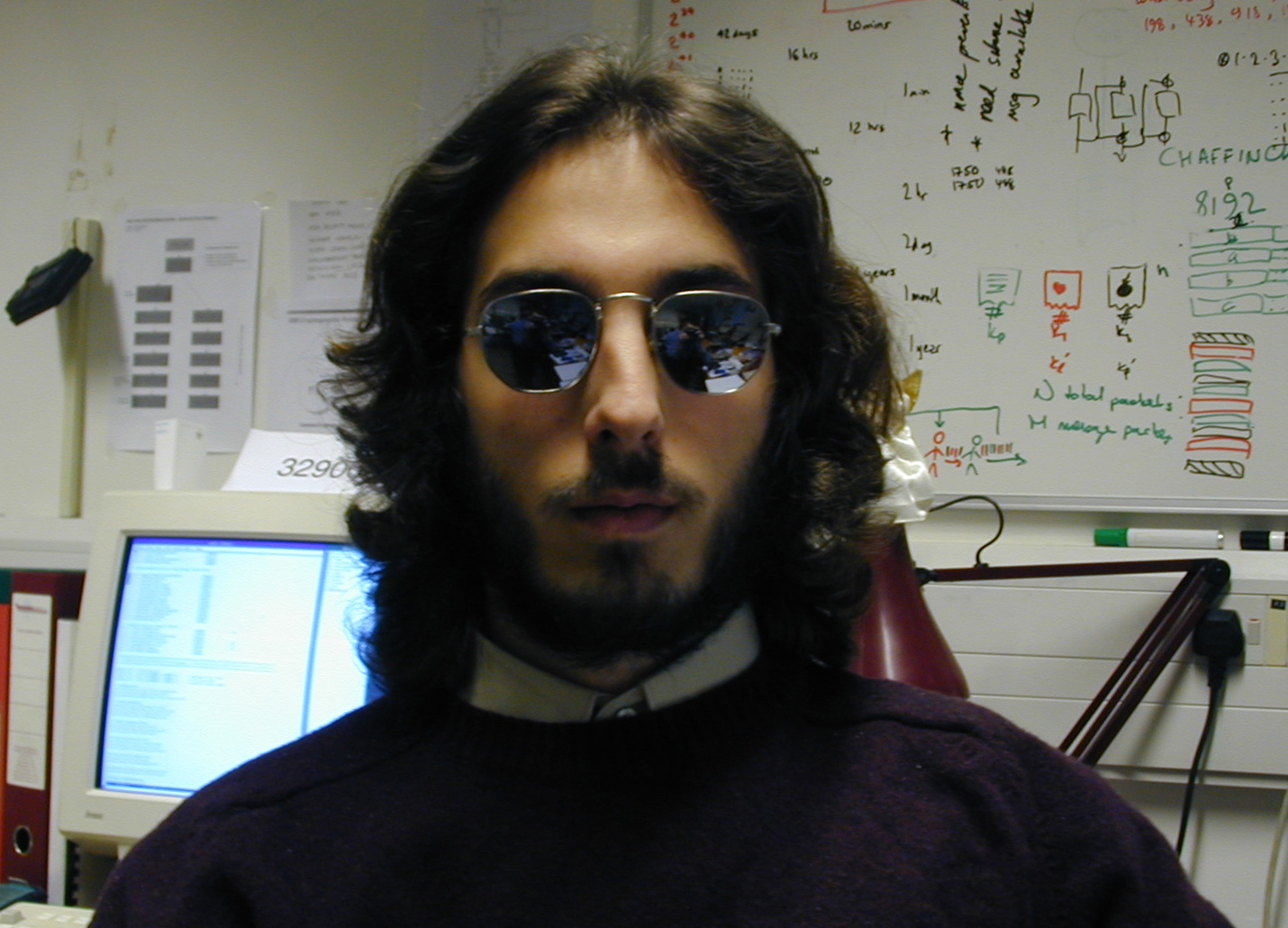
- Danezis as a PhD student at the University of Cambridge Computer Laboratory in January 2000
- Born: George Danezis; 6 December 1979 (age 46)
- Education: University of Cambridge
- Awards: FBCS (2014)
- Scientific career
- Fields: Computer science; Computer security; Distributed systems; Security engineering; Privacy engineering; Traffic analysis
- Workplaces: MystenLabs; Facebook; University College London; Alan Turing Institute; Microsoft Research; KU Leuven; University of Cambridge
- Thesis: Better Anonymous Communications (2004)
- Doctoral advisor: Ross Anderson
- Doctoral students: Mustafa Al-Bassam
- Website: http://www0.cs.ucl.ac.uk/staff/g.danezis/

George Danezis (born 6 December 1979) is a computer scientist and Professor of Security and Privacy Engineering at the Department of Computer Science, University College London where he is part of the Information Security Research Group, and a fellow at the Alan Turing Institute. He co-founded Chainspace, a sharded smart contract platform, and was Head of Research before it was acquired by Facebook. After leaving Facebook he co-founded Mysten Labs and is one of the designers of the Sui blockchain. He currently works part-time as a Professor at University College London and as Chief Scientist at Mysten Labs.

== Education ==
Danezis was educated at the University of Cambridge where he received a BA in Computer Science and a PhD in Computer Science. His PhD was supervised by Ross Anderson, where he completed his thesis on anonymous communications.

== Career and research ==
Before joining University College London, Danezis worked as a researcher at KU Leuven in Belgium and Microsoft Research in Cambridge. He has published research on anonymous communications and computer security.

In 2005, Danezis and Steven Murdoch published research showing that the Tor anonymity network was susceptible to traffic analysis that allowed adversaries to reduce the anonymity provided by Tor by inferring the network nodes that relay the anonymous data.

He has contributed to the design of anonymity networks including Hornet and Loopix, as well as the Sphinx packet format.

He has also contributed to the design of cryptocurrency systems, including RSCoin, a centrally banked cryptocurrency, and Chainspace, a sharded distributed ledger, which was spun-out into a commercial company and subsequently the first blockchain start-up acquired by Facebook.

== Awards and honours ==
Danezis was recognised as a Fellow of the British Computer Society in 2014, an award given to those who "demonstrate a commitment to advancing standards; strategic leadership and best practice, and encourage this in others".
