= Privacy software =

Layer to protect users' privacy

Privacy software, also called privacy platform, is software built to protect the privacy of its users. The software typically works in conjunction with Internet usage to control or limit the amount of information made available to third parties. The software can apply encryption or filtering of various kinds.

== Types of protection ==
Privacy software can refer to two different types of protection. The first type is protecting a user's Internet privacy from the World Wide Web. There are software products that will mask or hide a user's IP address from the outside world to protect the user from identity theft. The second type of protection is hiding or deleting the user's Internet traces that are left on their PC after they have been surfing the Internet. There is software that will erase all the user's Internet traces and there is software that will hide and (Encrypt) a user's traces so that others using their PC will not know where they have been surfing.

=== Whitelisting and blacklisting ===
One solution to enhance privacy software is whitelisting. Whitelisting is a process in which a company identifies the software that it will allow and does not try to recognize malware. Whitelisting permits acceptable software to run and either prevents anything else from running or lets new software run in a quarantined environment until its validity can be verified. Whereas whitelisting allows nothing to run unless it is on the whitelist, blacklisting allows everything to run unless it is on the black. A blacklist then includes certain types of software that are not allowed to run in the company environment. For example, a company might blacklist peer-to-peer file sharing on its systems. In addition to software, people, devices, and websites can also be whitelisted or blacklisted.

=== Intrusion detection systems ===
Intrusion detection systems are designed to detect all types of malicious network traffic and computer usage that cannot be detected by a firewall. These systems capture all network traffic flows and examine the contents of each packet for malicious traffic.

=== Encryption ===
Encryption is another form of privacy security. When organizations do not have a secure channel for sending information, they use encryption to stop unauthorized eavesdroppers. Encryption is the process of converting an original message into a form that cannot be read by anyone except the intended receiver.

=== Steganography ===
Steganography is the practice of representing information within another message or physical object, in such a manner that the presence of the information is not evident to human inspection. Its purpose is to hide messages from eavesdropping and e-surveillance. Compared to using cryptography, which translates the text itself to another format, steganography hides the data rather than converting it.

== Privacy vs anonymity ==
Privacy is different from anonymity in its applicability and usage. Anonymity is subordinate to privacy and might be desired for the exchange, retrieval, or publication of specific information.

== See also ==
=== General topics ===
- Information privacy
- Internet privacy
- Encryption
- Privacy
- Proxy server
- Metadata removal tool
- Privacy engineering
- Privacy-enhancing technologies

=== Software ===
- GNU Privacy Guard (GPG)
- NetShade
- Pretty Easy privacy
- Portable Firefox
- Pretty Good Privacy (PGP)
- Secure Shell (SSH)
- I2P
- Tor
- uProxy
