= NetShade =

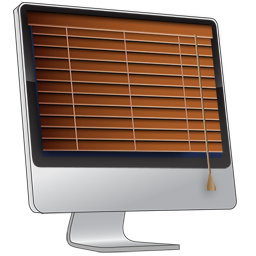
- Developer: Rayner Software
- Release: 2004
- Stable release: 7.0.1 / May 25, 2016; 10 years ago
- Operating system: Mac OS X, iOS
- Type: HTTP and HTTPS proxy service, VPN service
- License: Proprietary
- Website: www.raynersw.com/netshade/

NetShade is an app for Mac OS X and iOS which provides access to anonymous proxy and VPN servers. These servers include public HTTP/HTTPS proxies, as well as Rayner Software's own subscription-based proxies. NetShade's VPN servers run IPSec, and the proxy servers act using the HTTP/HTTPS web proxy standard.

== History ==
NetShade version 1.0 was released in 2004 for Mac OS X. The first version had no subscription-based proxy service, only a listing of public proxies. A dedicated NetShade proxy server was added for version 2.0 in 2005. Version 3, released in 2007, added a second NetShade proxy server, providing presence in both the US and UK. The current version, 7.0.1, includes dedicated proxy servers in the US, Canada, UK, Czech Republic, Germany, France, Italy, and the Netherlands.
