= VPN service =

Commercial service for proxied Internet access

A virtual private network (VPN) service is a proxy server marketed to help users bypass Internet censorship such as geo-blocking and users who want to protect their communications against user profiling or MitM attacks on hostile networks.

A wide variety of entities provide VPN services for several purposes. Depending on the provider and the application, they do not always create a true private network. Instead, many providers simply provide an Internet proxy that uses VPN technologies such as OpenVPN or WireGuard. Commercial VPN services are often used by those wishing to disguise or obfuscate their physical location or IP address, typically as a means to evade Internet censorship or geo-blocking.

Providers often market VPN services as privacy-enhancing, citing security features, such as encryption, from the underlying VPN technology. However, when the transmitted content is not encrypted before entering the proxy, that content is visible at the receiving endpoint regardless of whether the VPN tunnel itself is encrypted for the inter-node transport. On the client side, configurations intended to use VPN services as proxies are not conventional VPN configurations. However, they do typically utilize the operating system's VPN interfaces to capture the user's data to send to the proxy. This includes virtual network adapters on computer OSes and specialized "VPN" interfaces on mobile operating systems. A less common alternative is to provide a SOCKS proxy interface.

In 2025, 1.75 billion people used VPNs. By 2027, this market has been projected to grow to $76 billion. As of 2022, recommendation websites for VPNs tended to be affiliated with or even owned by VPN service providers, and VPN service providers often make misleading claims on their products.

== Reasons for use ==
While research on user behavior and motivations for using VPNs is relatively limited compared to technical literature, studies generally find that users are motivated by concerns over security and privacy, particularly protection against hackers. In contrast, a study of 349 college students found that students were more likely to use VPNs to access entertainment content than for privacy-related reasons. Another study of 90 technically savvy users reported that those motivated by privacy concerns, rather than by practical needs such as accessing geo-blocked content, were more likely to continue using VPNs over time. Surveys have also found that users tend to distrust free VPN services and express concern about providers collecting or selling their data.

VPN usage has also been observed to increase in response to content restrictions, social media taxes, and the implementation of age verification laws.

=== Accessing geo-restricted content ===
VPNs allow users to bypass regional restrictions by hiding their IP address from the destination server and simulating a connection from another country.

=== Improving privacy on public Wi-Fi ===
Where public Wi-Fi networks do not provide isolated encryption for each connected device, VPN services can provide a certain level of protection. When in use, potential eavesdroppers on the network can only observe that a connection to the VPN server is made by a user's device. As of June 2025, however, approximately 98% of human-generated internet traffic was encrypted using TLS through the HTTPS protocol; when TLS is used, network eavesdropping can only point out the IP addresses or hostnames a user is connecting to. Interception of network requests by a bad actor in the form of a Man-in-the-middle attack will most likely result in a certificate warning in being displayed in the user's browser.

SSL stripping, the practice of downgrading a connection to unencrypted HTTP, doesn't always result in a browser warning, although this has been partly mitigated by the implementation of HTTP Strict Transport Security.

=== Improving privacy ===
Activists and journalists working in restrictive or authoritarian regions can use VPNs to help maintain anonymity and protect sensitive communications.

== By geographical region ==
As of 2025, four of the top six countries of VPN adoption rates from 2020 through the first half of 2025 were in the Middle East: UAE #1, Qatar #2, Oman #5 and Saudi Arabia #6 Aside from bypassing a block of content, it is thought that bypassing of restrictions of voice over internet protocol (VoIP) services, like WhatsApp, Skype, and FaceTime are motivating factors.

== Criticism and limitations ==
Research has generally found that non-specialist users often have flawed mental models of VPNs and misunderstand the extent of the protection they provide. Such misconceptions may persist even among active VPN users.

Most users discover VPN services through review websites, which can be influenced by commercial incentives, with some relying on paid reviews and auctioning off the top review spot.

Users are commonly exposed to misinformation on the VPN services market, which makes it difficult for them to discern fact from false claims in advertisements. According to research by Consumer Reports, 12 out of 16 surveyed service providers had poor privacy and security practices and also made hyperbolic claims. The New York Times has advised users to reconsider whether a VPN service is worth their money. VPN services are not sufficient for protection against browser fingerprinting. The provider may log the user's traffic, although this depends on the individual company. Users can still be tracked through tracking cookies even if the user's IP address is hidden.

A VPN service is not in itself a means for good Internet privacy. The burden of trust is simply transferred from the Internet service provider to the VPN service provider.

== Legality ==
=== China ===
In 2019, a man in Guangdong, China was fined ¥1,000 (approximately $164 USD) for accessing overseas websites using a VPN.

In March 2026, police in Hubei, China, have announced that a man was warned and fined for "unauthorized use" of a Honor phone at home to connect to a VPN, browsing foreign apps TikTok and X. TikTok is a short-form content platform for markets outside China under Chinese technology giant ByteDance. Like Western social media platforms such as X, TikTok cannot be used normally in China.

In July 2026, Hunan Library announced the temporary shutdown and rectification of the Wi-Fi in the library, referring to the fact that some readers used Internet censorship circumvention software to access overseas “illegal websites” “without authorization” after connecting to the Internet, which “has serious security risks.” The relevant behavior has been recorded by the network information department, and the mobile phone numbers of the three readers involved have been exposed. Hunan Library would like to remind readers that cyberspace is not a lawless zone. The library will routinely strengthen its monitoring of the network environment and will maintain a "zero-tolerance" policy towards any violations of internet access regulations. Once a violation is verified, the mobile phone number involved will be permanently banned from accessing the library's network; serious cases involving suspected illegal activities will be handed over to the Chinese police department, Cyberspace Administration, and other law enforcement agencies for further handling.

In China, unlawful use of VPNs may result in criminal prosecution under the relatively obscure Supreme People’s Court guidelines: the Criminal Information Technology System Security Offense Adjudicative Guidelines and the Damage to Telecommunications Market Integrity Adjudicative Guidelines.

According to the guidelines, however, the simple use of typical VPN tunnels is not inherently unlawful because it does not achieve the elements of a computer crime, i.e. intrusion or unlawful control of a computer. VPN providers themselves can be prosecuted because providing a type of VPN in a way that severely disrupts the telecommunications market constitutes the offense of unlawful business operations. Additionally, if a VPN is used to commit illegal activities, then its provision could fall under aiding and abetting a crime. This was the logic applied by Chinese police in the widely publicized case involving a Chinese programmer who was penalized on grounds he used an unapproved international connection to provide internet consulting services to a company for 1,058,000 RMB in unlawful income.

=== Russia ===
Russia banned various VPN service providers in 2021. Law No. 276-FZ (2017) requires VPN/anonymizer services to prevent access to sites on the government blacklist; it prohibits owners of virtual private network (VPN) services and internet anonymizers from providing access to websites banned in Russia. The obligation is codified via amendments adding Article 15.8 to the Information Law and enforced by Roskomnadzor.

=== North Korea ===
Communication through other countries' communication networks without approval within North Korea is subject to a blanket criminal ban. The 2023 revision of the Radio Wave Control Law provides penalties including fines and "up to three months of unpaid labor or punishment by labor education".

=== Iran ===
VPNs are subject to general criminalization, but with discretion by the government to allow certain permissible uses. Use of filtering-circumvention tools (e.g., VPN services) is prohibited unless legally authorized by permit under the Supreme Council of Cyberspace’s 2024 resolution (cl. 6).

== Comparison of commercial virtual private network services ==
=== Privacy ===
In 2018 PC Magazine recommended that users consider choosing a provider based in a country with no data retention laws because that makes it easier for the service to keep a promise of no logging. PC Magazine and TechRadar also suggested that users read the provider's logging policy before signing up for the service, because some providers collect information about their customers' VPN usage.

=== Technical features ===
Service	Leak Protection			Protocols		Obfuscation / Censorship Avoidance							Network Neutrality		Server	
Service	First-party DNS servers	IPv6 supported / blocked	Offers kill switch	Offers OpenVPN	Offers WireGuard	Supports multihop	Supports TCP port 443	Supports Obfsproxy	Offers SOCKS	Linux support	Supports SSL tunnel	Supports SSH tunnel	Blocks SMTP (authent.)	Blocks P2P	Dedicated or virtual	Diskless
Avast SecureLine	Yes	Yes	Yes	Yes	No	No	No			No				Some	Dedicated	No
Amnezia VPN	Yes	No	Yes	Yes	Yes	No	Yes	No	Yes	Yes	Yes	Yes	Some	No	Virtual	Yes
ExpressVPN	Yes	Yes	Yes	Yes	No	No				Yes	Yes			No	Both	Yes
Hotspot Shield	No	No	Yes	No	No	No				No				?		
IPVanish	Yes	Yes	Yes	Yes	Yes	No	Yes	Yes	Yes	Yes	No	No	No	No	Dedicated	No
IVPN	Yes	Yes	Yes	Yes	Yes	Yes	Yes	Yes	Yes	Yes		Yes	No	No	Dedicated	No
Mullvad	Yes	Yes	Yes	Yes	Yes	Yes; WireGuard and SOCKS5	Yes	No	Yes	Yes	Yes	Yes	No	Yes	Dedicated	Yes
NordVPN	Yes	No	Yes	Yes	Yes; NordLynx based on WireGuard	Yes; OpenVPN and SOCKS5	Yes		Yes	Yes			Yes	No	Dedicated	Yes
NymVPN	Yes	Yes	Yes		Yes	Yes	Yes		Yes	Yes	Yes	Yes			Dedicated	Yes
Private Internet Access	Yes	Yes	Yes	Yes	Yes	Yes	Yes	No	Yes	Yes			Some (Note: The support team may be willing to whitelist your email provider's SMTP server upon request.)	No	Dedicated	Yes
PrivadoVPN	Yes	Yes	Yes	Yes	Yes				Yes	Yes				No		
ProtonVPN	Yes	No	Yes	Yes	Yes	Yes	Yes	No	No	Yes	Yes	Yes		Some (Note: Only on free plan.)	Dedicated	
PureVPN	Yes	Yes	Yes	Yes	No	No	Only through SSTP	No	No	Yes			No	Some	Both	No
TunnelBear	Yes	Yes	Yes	Yes	No	No	No	Yes	Yes	Yes			No	Some		
Windscribe	Yes	Yes	Yes	Yes	Yes	Yes	Yes	No	No	Yes (via Stealth protocol)	No		No	???	Dedicated (Note: With the exception of one virtual server located in Antarctica.)	Yes

=== Encryption ===
Service	Data encryption		Handshake encryption		Data authentication	
Service	Default provided	Strongest provided	Weakest provided	Strongest provided	Weakest provided	Strongest provided
Avast SecureLine	AES-256					
Amnezia VPN	AES-256 (GCM)		RSA-2048	RSA-4096	SHA-1	SHA-512
ExpressVPN	AES-256			CA-4096		
Hotspot Shield	AES-128		TLS 1.2 ECDHE PFS		HMAC	
IPVanish	AES-256		RSA-2048		SHA-256	
IVPN	AES-256			RSA-4096		
Mullvad	AES-256 (GCM)	ML-KEM	RSA-4096		SHA-512	
NordVPN	AES-256	AES-256 (CBC)	2048-bit Diffie-Hellman			
NymVPN	AES-256 (GCM)					
Private Internet Access	AES-128 (CBC)	AES-256	ECC-256k1	RSA-4096	SHA-1	SHA-256
PrivadoVPN	AES-256					
ProtonVPN	AES-256		RSA-4096		HMAC with SHA-384	
PureVPN	AES-256					
SaferVPN	AES-256		2048bit SSL/TLS		SHA-256	
TunnelBear	AES-128 (CBC) (Note: Only on iOS 8 and earlier. All other supported devices and operating systems use AES-256 (CBC).)	AES-256 (CBC)	1548 bit Diffie–Hellman (Note: iOS 9 and later use 2048 bit. iOS 8 and earlier use 1548 bit. All other supported devices and operating systems use 4096 bit.)	4096 bit Diffie–Hellman	SHA-1 (Note: iOS 8 and earlier use SHA-1. All other supported devices and operating systems use SHA-256.)	SHA-256
Windscribe	AES-256		RSA-4096		SHA-512	

=== Definitions ===
The following definitions clarify the meaning of some of the column headers in the comparison tables above.

Anonymous payment method
Whether the service offers at least one payment method that does not require personal information. Even if a service accepts a cryptocurrency like bitcoin, it might still require that the customer hands over personally identifiable information (PII) like their full name and address.
Bandwidth
Whether the users' bandwidth is logged while using the service, according to the service's privacy policy.
Diskless
Whether the service's server hardware is connected to hard drives, according to the service provider. If the servers are diskless, the service provider should be unable to log any usage data.
First-party DNS servers
Whether the service provides its own domain name system (DNS) servers.
Kill switch
Whether the service has the ability to immediately sever your connection to the Internet in the event that the VPN connection fails. This prevents a user IP address leak.
Logging
Whether the service stores information about their users' connection or activity on the network, according to the service's privacy policy or terms of service. If logging isn't mentioned in those sections but denied somewhere else on the website, the particular table cell will be marked as "No" in yellow and include an explanatory note.
Privacy Impact Score
An indicator of a website's usage of potentially privacy intrusive technologies such as third-party or permanent cookies, canvas trackers etc. The score can be in the range from 0 to 100, where 0 is minimal privacy impact (best) and 100 is the biggest privacy impact (worst) relative to other web sites. The score also has a simplified letter and colour presentation from A to F where A is "No cookies" and F is "Score above three standard deviations from the average". The metric is developed by WebCookies.org.
Obfuscation
Whether the service provides a method of obfuscating the VPN traffic so that it's not as easily detected and blocked by national governments or corporations.
Offers WireGuard
Whether the service provider offers the WireGuard tunneling protocol.
SSL rating
The service's website's overall SSL server rating according to Qualys SSL Labs' SSL Server Test tool.
Supports Obfsproxy
Whether the service has an implementation of the Tor subproject Obfsproxy.
