= Cure53 =

German cybersecurity firm

- Industry: Cybersecurity
- Headquarters: Berlin, Germany
- Website: cure53.de

Cure53 is a German cybersecurity firm. The company was founded by Mario Heiderich, a security researcher.

== History ==
After a report from Cure53 on the South Korean security app Smart Sheriff, that described the app's security holes as "catastrophic", the South Korean government ordered the Smart Sheriff to be shut down.

Software audited by Cure53 includes Mastodon, OnionShare, Bitwarden, Mailvelope, GlobaLeaks, SecureDrop, Obsidian (client software), OpenPGP, Onion Browser, F-Droid, Nitrokey, Peerio, OpenKeychain, cURL, Briar, Mozilla Thunderbird, Threema, MetaMask, Obsidian, Proton Pass, Coinbase, Mullvad, Nym, Enpass, as well as many VPN and password manager providers.

Cure53 created the DOMPurify JavaScript library for prevention of cross-site scripting.
