= Tamarin Prover =

Software for formal verification of cryptographic protocols

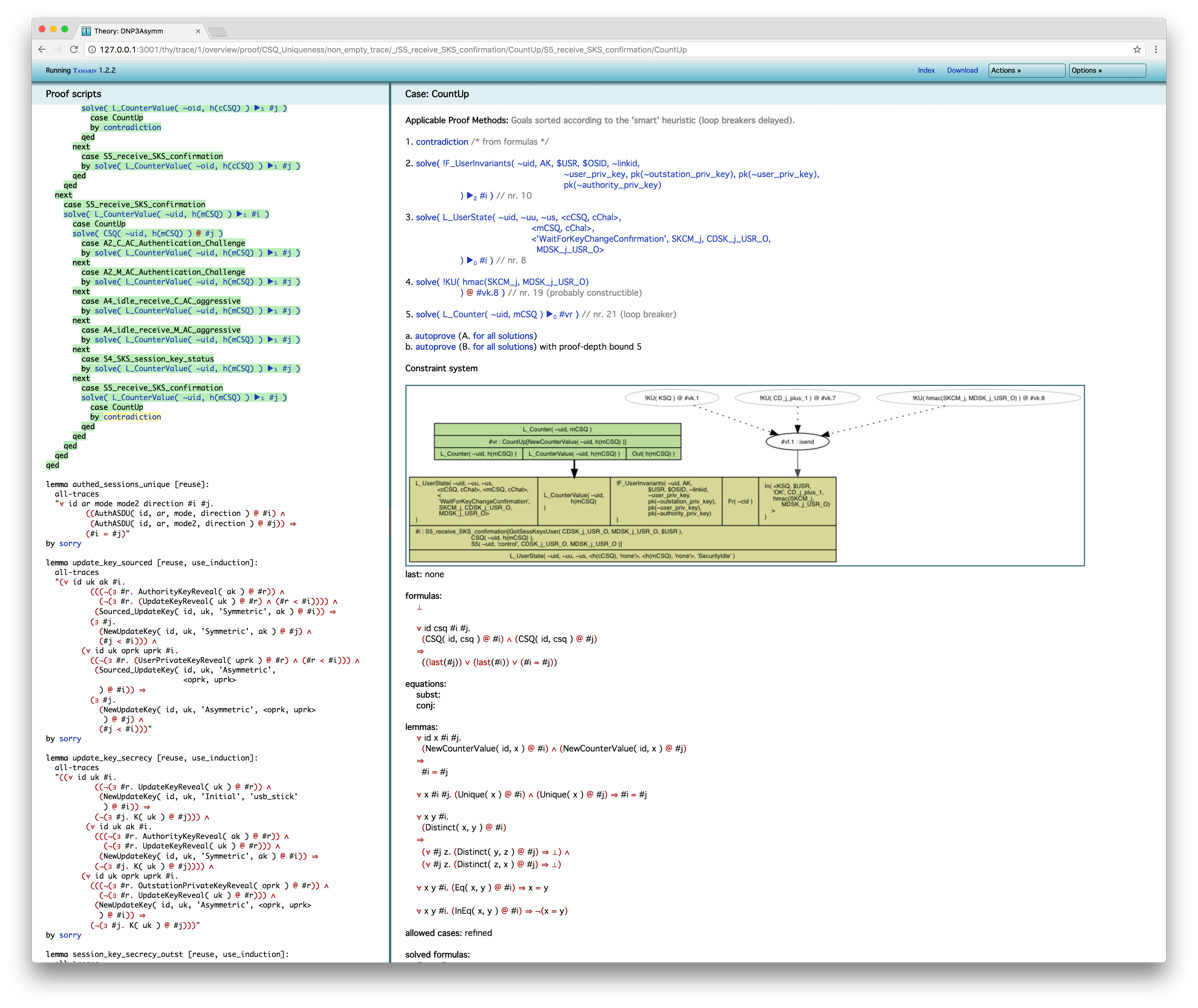
- Original authors: David Basin, Cas Cremers, Jannik Dreier, Simon Meier, Ralf Sasse, Benedikt Schmidt
- Developers: Cas Cremers, Jannik Dreier, Ralf Sasse
- Release: April 24, 2012
- Stable release: 1.12.0 / March 7, 2026
- Written in: Haskell
- Operating system: Linux, macOS
- Available in: English
- Type: Automated reasoning
- License: GNU GPL v3
- Website: tamarin-prover.github.io
- Repository: github.com/tamarin-prover/tamarin-prover

Tamarin Prover is a computer software program for formal verification of cryptographic protocols. It has been used to verify Transport Layer Security 1.3, ISO/IEC 9798, DNP3 Secure Authentication v5, WireGuard, and the PQ3 Messaging Protocol of Apple iMessage.

Tamarin is an open source tool, written in Haskell, built as a successor to an older verification tool called Scyther. Tamarin has automatic proof features, but can also be self-guided. In Tamarin lemmas that representing security properties are defined. After changes are made to a protocol, Tamarin can verify if the security properties are maintained. The results of a Tamarin execution will either be a proof that the security property holds within the protocol, an example protocol run where the security property does not hold, or Tamarin could potentially fail to halt.

== See also ==
- Dolev–Yao model
- Hybrid argument
- ProVerif
