= Information-theoretic security =

Security of a cryptosystem which derives purely from information theory

A cryptosystem is considered to have information-theoretic security (also called unconditional security) if the system is secure against adversaries with unlimited computing resources and time. In contrast, a system which depends on the computational cost of cryptanalysis to be secure (and thus can be broken by an attack with unlimited computation) is called computationally secure or conditionally secure.

== Overview ==
An encryption protocol with information-theoretic security is impossible to break even with infinite computational power. Protocols proven to be information-theoretically secure are resistant to future developments in computing. The concept of information-theoretically secure communication was introduced in 1949 by American mathematician Claude Shannon, one of the founders of classical information theory, who used it to prove the one-time pad system was secure. Information-theoretically secure cryptosystems have been used for the most sensitive governmental communications, such as diplomatic cables and high-level military communications.

There are a variety of cryptographic tasks for which information-theoretic security is a meaningful and useful requirement. A few of these are:

1. Secret sharing schemes such as Shamir's are information-theoretically secure (and also perfectly secure) in that having less than the requisite number of shares of the secret provides no information about the secret.
2. More generally, secure multiparty computation protocols often have information-theoretic security.
3. Private information retrieval with multiple databases can be achieved with information-theoretic privacy for the user's query.
4. Conditional disclosure of secrets is a well studied setting which is usually studied in the context of information-theoretic security.
5. Reductions between cryptographic primitives or tasks can often be achieved information-theoretically. Such reductions are important from a theoretical perspective because they establish that primitive $\Pi$ can be realized if primitive $\Pi'$ can be realized.
6. Symmetric encryption can be constructed under an information-theoretic notion of security called entropic security, which assumes that the adversary knows almost nothing about the message being sent. The goal here is to hide all functions of the plaintext rather than all information about it.
7. Information-theoretic cryptography is quantum-safe.

== Physical layer encryption ==
=== Technical limitations ===
Algorithms which are computationally or conditionally secure (i.e., they are not information-theoretically secure) are dependent on resource limits. For example, RSA relies on the assertion that factoring large numbers is hard.

A weaker notion of security, defined by Aaron D. Wyner, established a now-flourishing area of research that is known as physical layer encryption. It exploits the physical Wireless channel for its security by communications, signal processing, and coding techniques. The security is provable, unbreakable, and quantifiable (in bits/second/hertz).

Wyner's initial physical layer encryption work in the 1970s posed the Alice–Bob–Eve problem in which Alice wants to send a message to Bob without Eve decoding it. If the channel from Alice to Bob is statistically better than the channel from Alice to Eve, it had been shown that secure communication is possible. That is intuitive, but Wyner measured the secrecy in information theoretic terms defining secrecy capacity, which essentially is the rate at which Alice can transmit secret information to Bob. Shortly afterward, Imre Csiszár and Körner showed that secret communication was possible even if Eve had a statistically better channel to Alice than Bob did. Channel resolvability later became another method for proving strong secrecy. Hayashi and Watanabe formulated strong secrecy from channel resolvability, showing how approximating the eavesdropper's output distribution can imply information-theoretic secrecy. The basic idea of the information theoretic approach to securely transmit confidential messages (without using an encryption key) to a legitimate receiver is to use the inherent randomness of the physical medium (including noises and channel fluctuations due to fading) and exploit the difference between the channel to a legitimate receiver and the channel to an eavesdropper to benefit the legitimate receiver. More recent theoretical results are concerned with determining the secrecy capacity and optimal power allocation in broadcast fading channels. There are caveats, as many capacities are not computable unless the assumption is made that Alice knows the channel to Eve. If that were known, Alice could simply place a null in Eve's direction. Secrecy capacity for MIMO and multiple colluding eavesdroppers is more recent and ongoing work, and such results still make the non-useful assumption about eavesdropper channel state information knowledge.

Still other work is less theoretical by attempting to compare implementable schemes. One physical layer encryption scheme is to broadcast artificial noise in all directions except that of Bob's channel, which basically jams Eve. One paper by Negi and Goel details its implementation, and Khisti and Wornell computed the secrecy capacity when only statistics about Eve's channel are known.

Parallel to that work in the information theory community is work in the antenna community, which has been termed near-field direct antenna modulation or directional modulation. It has been shown that by using a parasitic array, the transmitted modulation in different directions could be controlled independently. Secrecy could be realized by making the modulations in undesired directions difficult to decode. Directional modulation data transmission was experimentally demonstrated using a phased array. Others have demonstrated directional modulation with switched arrays and phase-conjugating lenses.

That type of directional modulation is really a subset of Negi and Goel's additive artificial noise encryption scheme. Another scheme using pattern-reconfigurable transmit antennas for Alice called reconfigurable multiplicative noise (RMN) complements additive artificial noise. The two work well together in channel simulations in which nothing is assumed known to Alice or Bob about the eavesdroppers.

== Secret key agreement ==
The different works mentioned in the previous part employ, in one way or another, the randomness present in the wireless channel to transmit information-theoretically secure messages. Conversely, we could analyze how much secrecy one can extract from the randomness itself in the form of a secret key. That is the goal of secret key agreement.

In this line of work, started by Maurer and Ahlswede and Csiszár, the basic system model removes any restriction on the communication schemes and assumes that the legitimate users can communicate over a two-way, public, noiseless, and authenticated channel at no cost. This model has been subsequently extended to account for multiple users and a noisy channel among others.

== See also ==
- Leftover hash lemma (privacy amplification)
- Semantic security
