= George Blakley =

American mathematician and cryptographer

George Robert Blakley, Jr.
- 2007
- Born: May 6, 1932
- Died: December 10, 2018 (aged 86)
- Education: Georgetown University (BSc); University of Maryland (PhD)
- Known for: Secret sharing
- Scientific career
- Fields: Cryptography
- Workplaces: Cornell University, Harvard University, University of Illinois at Urbana–Champaign, State University of New York at Buffalo
- Thesis: Partitions and Power Series (1960)
- Doctoral advisor: James A. Hummel, Georg Johann Rieger

George Robert Blakley Jr., known as Bob or G.R. Blakley, was an American cryptographer and a professor of mathematics at Texas A&M University, best known for inventing a secret sharing scheme in 1979 (see).

== Biography ==
Blakley did his undergraduate studies in physics at Georgetown University, and received his Ph.D. in mathematics from the University of Maryland in 1960. After postdoctoral studies at Cornell University and Harvard University, he held faculty positions at the University of Illinois at Urbana–Champaign and the State University of New York at Buffalo before joining Texas A&M in 1970.

Dr. Blakley was a professor at Texas A&M University for 44 years from 1970 - 2014, and professor emeritus from 2014 until his death. At Texas A&M, he was chairman of the mathematics department from 1970 to 1978.

Blakley served on the board of directors of the International Association for Cryptologic Research from 1993 to 1995. He co-founded the International Journal of Information Security, published by Springer-Verlag, in 2000, and then served on its advisory board.

His son, George Robert (Bob) Blakley III, is also a computer security researcher.

== Secret-sharing scheme ==
In order to split a secret into several shares, Blakley's scheme specifies the secret as a point in n-dimensional space, and gives out shares that correspond to hyperplanes that intersect the secret point. Any n such hyperplanes will specify the point, while fewer than n hyperplanes will leave at least one degree of freedom, and thus leave the point unspecified.

In contrast, Shamir's secret sharing scheme represents the secret as the y-intercept of an n-degree polynomial, and shares correspond to points on the polynomial.

== Awards and honors ==
In 2001 Blakley received an honorary doctorate from Queensland University of Technology.

In 2009 he was named a fellow of the International Association for Cryptologic Research.

In 2007 Dr. Blakley was awarded U.S. Patent #7 218 734 (ring arithmetic method, system and apparatus)

In 2009 Dr. Blakley was awarded U.S. Patent #7 502 468 (generating cryptographically random numbers)
