= CryptoVerif =

Software tool for software verification

- Initial release: 2005
- Stable release: 1.21 / September 3, 2015
- Written in: OCaml
- Available in: English
- License: Mainly the GNU GPL / Windows binary BSD licenses
- Website: prosecco.gforge.inria.fr/personal/bblanche/cryptoverif/

CryptoVerif is a software tool for the automatic reasoning about security protocols written by Bruno Blanchet.

== Supported cryptographic mechanisms ==
It provides a mechanism for specifying the security assumptions on cryptographic primitives, which can handle in particular

- symmetric encryption,
- message authentication codes,
- public-key encryption,
- signatures,
- hash functions.

== Concrete security ==
CryptoVerif claims to evaluate the probability of a successful attack against a protocol relative to the probability of breaking each cryptographic primitive, i.e. it can establish concrete security.
