= Cas Cremers =

Dutch computer scientist (born 1974)

- Born: 16 June 1974 (age 52); Geleen
- Education: Eindhoven University of Technology
- Scientific career
- Fields: Computer Science, Computer Security
- Workplaces: CISPA Helmholtz Center for Information Security
- Thesis: Scyther - Semantics and Verification of Security Protocols (2006)
- Doctoral advisor: Sjouke Mauw
- Other academic advisors: Erik de Vink

Casimier Joseph Franciscus "Cas" Cremers (born 16 June 1974) is a computer scientist and a faculty member at the CISPA Helmholtz Center for Information Security in Saarbruecken, Germany.

== Career ==
Cremers received his PhD from Eindhoven University of Technology in 2006, under the supervision of Sjouke Mauw and Erik de Vink. Between 2006 and 2013, he worked at the Information Security Group at ETH Zurich, Switzerland, until joining the University of Oxford in 2013. He was made full professor of Information Security in 2015. His research focuses on information security, in particular the formal analysis of security protocols. This work ranges from developing mathematical foundations for protocol analysis to the development of analysis tools, notably the Scyther and Tamarin tools. Recently his research expanded into directions such as protocol standardisation, including the improvement of the ISO/IEC 9798 standard, and applied cryptography, leading to the development of new security requirements and protocols. His joint work with Marko Horvat, Sam Scott, and Thyla van der Merwe led to a not insignificant change to the TLS 1.3 specification.

In 2018 Cremers moved from Oxford University to the Cispa Helmholtz Center for Information Security at Saarbrücken.

Cremers previously worked in MSX computer game development, initially working for the Sigma Group before founding his own group Parallax; he is credited for work on nine different games, and many other demos, in a combination of roles including programmer, designer, composer, and writer. He was interviewed by blog "Distrito Entebras" on the history of his career working in MSX games development.

== Publications ==
Cremers' publications cover security, cryptography, ISO standards, automated verification of security protocols, and formal methods. His thesis was entitled "Scyther - Semantics and Verification of Security Protocols", and was supervised by Sjouke Mauw and Erik de Vink. Also published with Sjouke Mauw is their book Operational Semantics and Verification of Security Protocols.
