= Michael Ben-Or =

Israeli computer scientist

Michael Ben-Or (Hebrew: מיכאל בן-אור) is an Israeli computer scientist, the Jean and Helena Alfassa Professor of computer science at the Hebrew University of Jerusalem. His research interests include Theoretical Computer Science, Distributed Computation, Fault-Tolerance, Cryptography and Quantum Computation.

He received his PhD in Mathematics from the Hebrew University in 1982. Three of his papers received the Dijkstra Prize in Distributed Computing:

- 2023: For the papers, "for introducing Information-Theoretic Secure Multiparty Computations and showing how to achieve maximal resilience to malicious adversaries while providing unconditional security.":
  - Michael Ben-Or, Shafi Goldwasser and Avi Wigderson for "Completeness Theorems for Non-Cryptographic Fault-Tolerant Distributed Computation" in Proceedings of the 20th ACM Symposium on Theory of Computing (STOC), Chicago, Illinois, USA, May 1988, pages 1-10.
  - Tal Rabin and Michael Ben-Or for "Verifiable Secret Sharing and Multiparty Protocols with Honest Majority" in Proceedings of the 21st ACM Symposium on Theory of Computing (STOC), Seattle, Washington, USA, May 1989, pages 73-85
- 2015: Michael Ben-Or, "Another Advantage of Free Choice: Completely Asynchronous Agreement Protocols", in Proceedings of the Second ACM Symposium on Principles of Distributed Computing, pages 27-30, August 1983
