= National Information Assurance Glossary =

Government glossary of information-security terms

Committee on National Security Systems Instruction No. 4009, National Information Assurance Glossary, published by the United States federal government, is an unclassified glossary of information-security terms intended to provide a common vocabulary for discussing Information Assurance concepts.

The glossary was previously published as the National Information Systems Security Glossary (NSTISSI No. 4009) by the National Security Telecommunications and Information Systems Security Committee (NSTISSC). Under Executive Order (E.O.) 13231 of October 16, 2001, Critical Infrastructure Protection in the Information Age, the President George W. Bush redesignated the National Security Telecommunications and Information Systems Security Committee (NSTISSC) as the Committee on National Security Systems (CNSS).

The most recent version was revised April 26, 2010.
