= Tal Rabin =

American cryptographer

- טל רבין
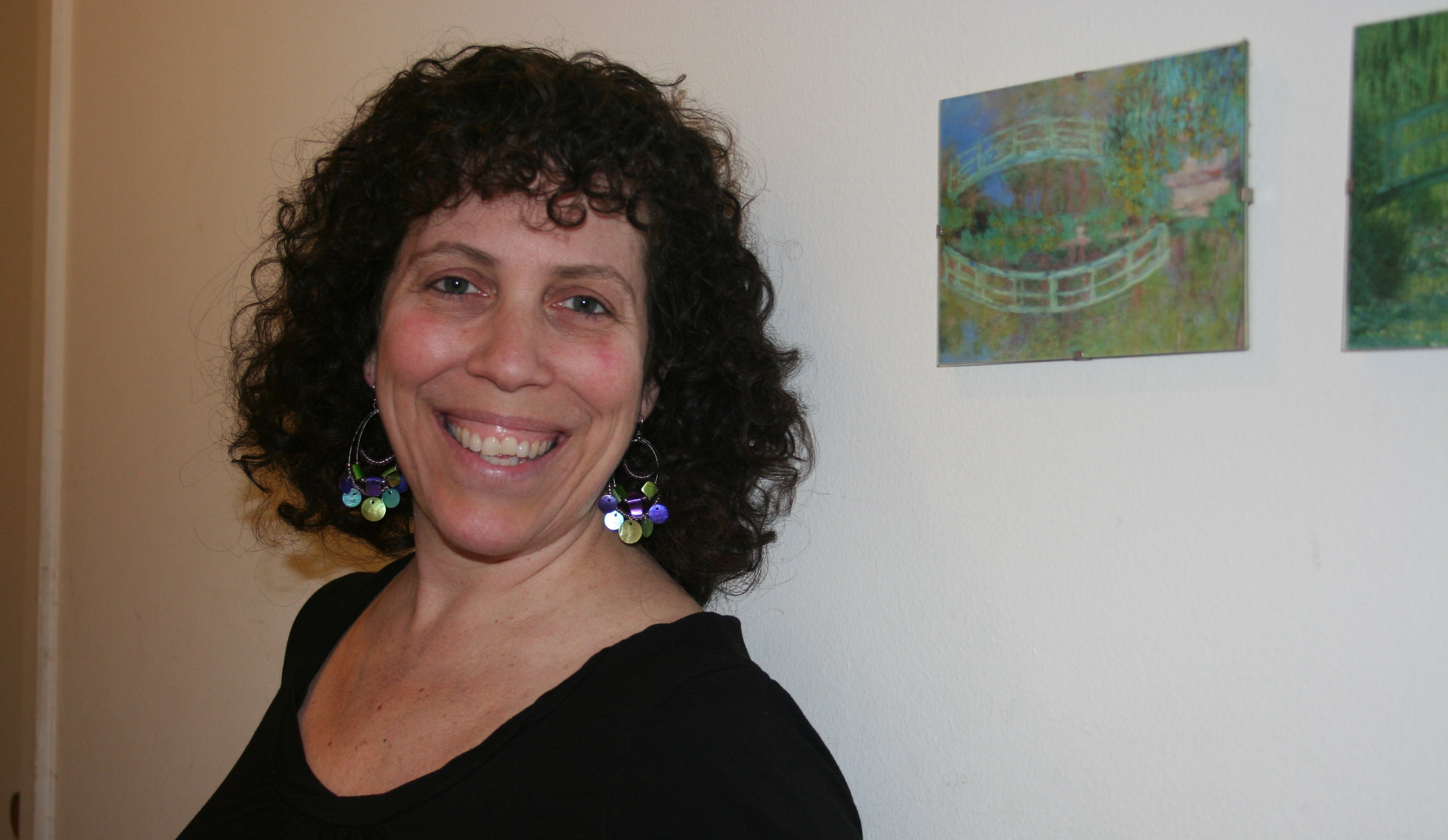
- Tal Rabin
- Born: 1962 (age 63–64); Newton, Massachusetts, United States
- Education: Hebrew University of Jerusalem
- Awards: American Academy of Arts and Sciences (2016); Woman of Vision (2014)
- Scientific career
- Fields: Computer science
- Workplaces: University of Pennsylvania, Thomas J. Watson Research Center
- Thesis: Fault Tolerant and Secure Computations in Distributed Systems (1995)
- Doctoral advisor: Michael Ben-Or

Tal Rabin (Hebrew: טל רבין; born 1962) is a computer scientist and Professor of Computer and Information Science at the University of Pennsylvania and a Director at Amazon Web Services (AWS). She was previously the head of research at the Algorand Foundation and the head of the cryptography research group at IBM's Thomas J. Watson Research Center.

== Biography ==
Rabin was born in Massachusetts and grew up in Jerusalem. As a child, she enjoyed solving riddles and playing strategic games. Her father, Michael Rabin, was a celebrated computer scientist who was responsible for many breakthroughs in the fields of computability and cryptography. She and her father co-authored a paper together. She is the mother of two daughters.

== Career ==
In 1986, she received her BSc from the Hebrew University of Jerusalem. She continued her studies there for her MSc (1988) and PhD (1994) degrees under the supervision of Professor Michael Ben-Or. Between 1994 and 1996, she was an National Science Foundation postdoctoral fellow at MIT. She later joined the cryptography group at the Thomas J. Watson Research Center and became head of the group in 1997. In 2020, she joined the University of Pennsylvania as the Rachleff Family Professor of Computer and Information Science.

Rabin's research focuses on cryptography and network security, specifically the design of efficient and secure encryption algorithms. In addition, she studies secure distributed protocols and the theoretical foundations of cryptography, as well as number theory and the theory of algorithms and distributed systems. She has co-authored over 100 papers. She has also registered five patents in the US. Her research focuses on making communications over the Internet more secure. Her most cited works in this field focus on the design of digital signature schemes, which are widely used, among other applications, in protocols for secure web communication. Another focus is on a different scheme of encrypted communications called secret sharing. A sizable part of her work on these subjects is done in collaboration with Rosario Gennaro and Hugo Krawczyk.

Rabin has been on the committees of many leading cryptography conferences, including TCC, Crypto, PKC and Eurocrypt. She was a council member of the Computing Community Consortium (2013–2016), a member of the executive committee of SIGACT (2012–2015), and a member of the editorial board of the Journal of Cryptology. She is a founder and organizer of the Women in Theory Workshop, a biennial event for graduate students in theoretical computer science. She is also involved in activities to make the field of encryption more accessible to the general public. In 2011, she took part in the World Science Festival, a popular science event held in New York City. In 2014, she took part in a similar event, the WNYC Science Fair.

== Awards ==
2014: One of the 22 most powerful women engineers in the world by Business Insider

2014: Woman of Vision for innovation by the Anita Borg Institute

2015: IACR Fellow (International Association for Cryptologic Research)

2016: Fellow of the American Academy of Arts and Sciences

2017: ACM Fellow

2018: One of America's Top 50 Women in Tech by Forbes

2019: The RSA Award for Excellence in Mathematics

2023: The Dijkstra Prize for work in secure multiparty computation (MPC)
