= List of cryptosystems =

A cryptosystem is a set of cryptographic algorithms that map ciphertexts and plaintexts to each other.

== Private-key cryptosystems ==
Private-key cryptosystems use the same key for encryption and decryption.

- Caesar cipher
- Substitution cipher
- Enigma machine
- Data Encryption Standard
- Twofish
- Serpent
- Camellia
- Salsa20
- ChaCha20
- Blowfish
- CAST5
- Kuznyechik
- RC4
- 3DES
- Skipjack
- Safer
- IDEA
- Advanced Encryption Standard, also known as AES and Rijndael.

== Public-key cryptosystems ==
Public-key cryptosystems use a public key for encryption and a private key for decryption.

- Diffie–Hellman key exchange
- RSA encryption
- Rabin cryptosystem
- Schnorr signature
- ElGamal encryption
- Elliptic-curve cryptography
- Lattice-based cryptography
- McEliece cryptosystem
- Multivariate cryptography
- Isogeny-based cryptography
