= IAPM (mode) =

Authenticated encryption mode for block ciphers

Integrity-aware parallelizable mode (IAPM) is a mode of operation for cryptographic block ciphers. As its name implies, it allows for a parallel mode of operation for higher throughput.

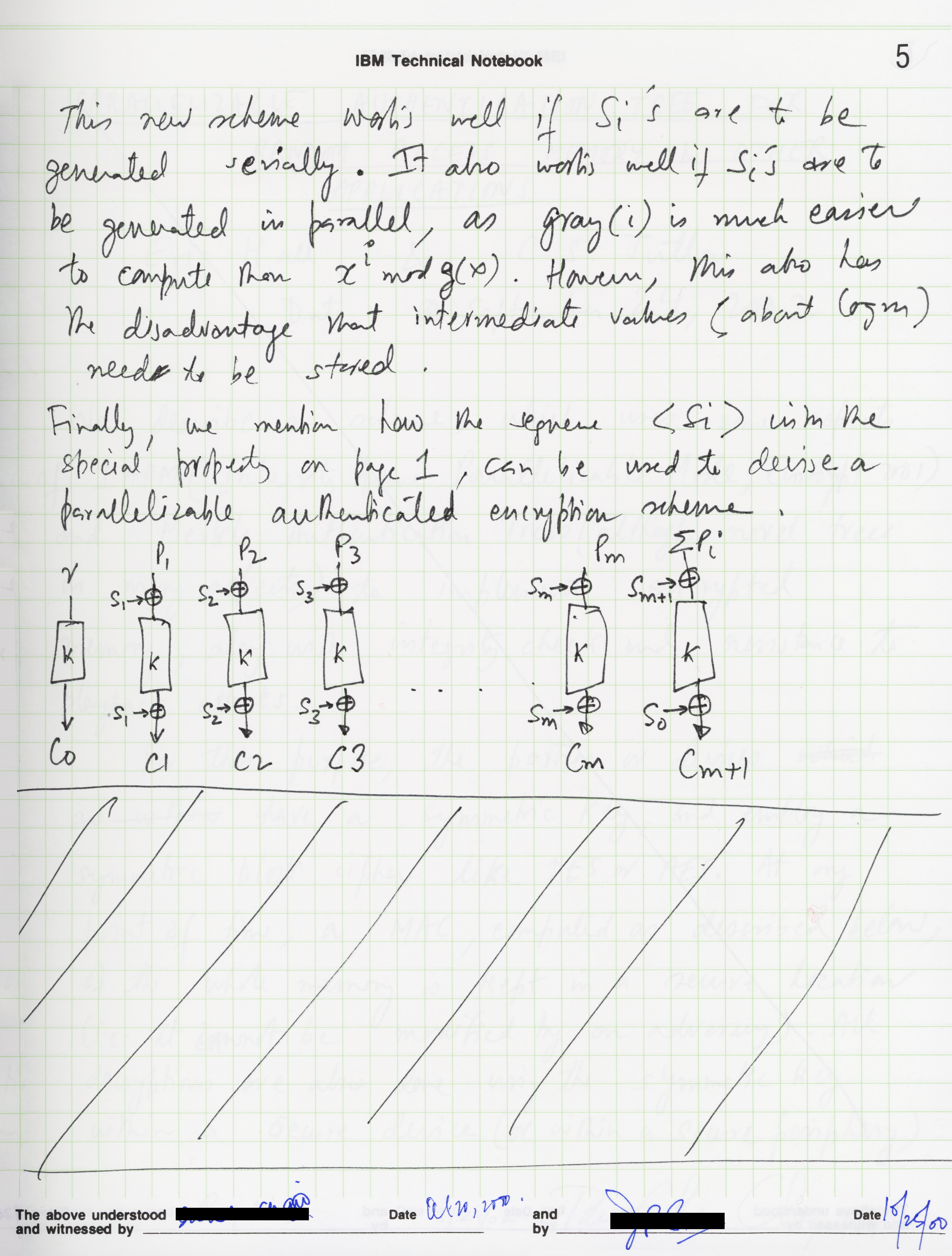
Charanjit Jutla's hand-drawn IAPM figure in IBM Technical Notebook (Oct 2000)

== Encryption and authentication ==
At the time of its creation, IAPM was one of the first cipher modes to provide both authentication and privacy in a single pass. (In earlier authenticated encryption designs, two passes would be required to: one to encrypt, and the second to compute a MAC.)

IAPM was proposed for use in IPsec.

Other AEAD schemes also provide all of the single pass, privacy and authentication properties. IAPM has mostly been supplanted by Galois/counter mode.

== See also ==
- OCB mode
- IAPM mode described in more detail in Hebrew Wikipedia.
