= IAPM =

IAPM may refer to:

- IAPM (mode), a mode of operation for cryptographic block ciphers
- Indian Association of Pathologists and Microbiologists
- IAPM Mall, shopping mall in Shanghai, China
