= ANSI C12.19 =

Standard for data tables used in automated meter reading

ANSI C12.19 is the American National Standard for Utility Industry End Device Data Tables

This standard defines a table structure for utility application data to be passed between an end device and a computer. The "end device" is typically an electricity meter, and the "computer" is typically a hand-held device carried by a meter reader, or a meter communication module which is part of an automatic meter reading system. C12.19 does not define end device design criteria nor specify the language or protocol used to transport that data. There are however related ANSI standards which do specify the transportation of these tables. ANSI C12.18 describes the communication of C12.19 tables over an optical port. ANSI C12.21 describes the communication of C12.19 tables over a modem. ANSI C12.22 describes the communication of C12.19 tables over a network.

The purpose of the tables is to define structures for transporting data to and from end devices. A related standard, IEC 61968 defines a CIM information model for energy data.

== History ==
The structures were originally known as the "Tucker Tables" (after Richard Tucker.) The tables were developed under the auspices of the American National Standards Institute, C12, SC17, WG2. The standard is sponsored by NEMA, and also published as MC12.19 and IEEE Std 1377.

Popularity of the tables has grown over the years such that most electric meter vendors in North America now support and use the tables in their products.

The committee (working group 2) is currently chaired by Avygdor Moise and released a revision 2 of the standard in 2008, revision 2.1 of the standard in 2012.

Effective 2014, the object identifiers (device classes) and XML documents (TDLs/EDLs) of this standard are managed and registered by the Energy Communications Management eXchange (ECMX) under the supervision of the North American End Device Registration Authority (NAEDRA).
