= CWC mode =

Authenticated encryption mode for block ciphers

In cryptography, CWC Mode (Carter–Wegman + CTR mode) is an AEAD block cipher mode of operation that provides both encryption and built-in message integrity, similar to CCM and OCB modes. It combines the use of CTR mode with a 128-bit block cipher for encryption with an efficient polynomial Carter–Wegman MAC with a tag length of at most 128 bits and is designed by Tadayoshi Kohno, John Viega and Doug Whiting.

CWC mode was submitted to NIST for standardization, but NIST opted for the similar GCM mode instead.

Although GCM has weaknesses compared to CWC, the GCM authors successfully argued for GCM.

CWC allows the payload and associated data to be at most 2^{32} - 1 blocks or nearly 550 GB.
