= ANSI C12.22 =

Communication standard for automatic meter reading

ANSI C12.22 is the American National Standard for Protocol Specification for Interfacing to Data Communication Networks

ANSI C12.22/IEEE Std 1703 describe a protocol for transporting ANSI C12.19 table data over networks, for the purpose of interoperability among communications modules and meters. This standard uses AES encryption to enable strong, secure communications, including confidentiality and data integrity. The cipher mode used, a derivation of EAX mode called EAX' (EAX prime), is provably secure in the context of C12.22. However, this cipher mode cannot be used securely for non-standard short messages (messages less than the key length of 16 bytes). Its security model is extensible to support new security mechanisms.

ANSI C12.22/IEEE Std 1703 define message services which are components of an Advanced Metering Infrastructure (AMI) for smart grids.

There is also RFC 6142 for transporting C12.22 data using TCP and UDP transport over IP networks.

The ANSI C12.22 / IEEE Std 1703 service and domains consist of ANSI C12.22 / IEEE Std 1703 Network Segments and ANSI C12.22 / IEEE Std 1703 Nodes that are managed by distributed trusted centers, network relays and gateways. As smart grid AMI networks evolve, ANSI C12.22 / IEEE 1703 domains may be created to service the utilities' Field Area Networks (FAN) and the Home/Premise Area Networks (HAN/PAN). Nodes that operate in these domains must be registered with unique application title names (ApTitles) that need to be registered (ECMX).
