= Digital signature forgery =

Security definition for digital signatures

In a cryptographic digital signature or MAC system, digital signature forgery is the ability to create a pair consisting of a message, $m$, and a signature (or MAC), $\sigma$, that is valid for $m$, but has not been created in the past by the legitimate signer. There are different types of forgery.

To each of these types, security definitions can be associated. A signature scheme is secure by a specific definition if no forgery of the associated type is possible.

== Types ==
The following definitions are ordered from lowest to highest achieved security, in other words, from most powerful to the weakest attack. The definitions form a hierarchy, meaning that an attacker able to mount a specific attack can execute all the attacks further down the list. Likewise, a scheme that reaches a certain security goal also reaches all prior ones.

=== Total break ===
More general than the following attacks, there is also a total break: when an adversary can recover the private information and keys used by the signer, they can create any possible signature on any message.

=== Universal forgery (universal unforgeability, UUF) ===
Universal forgery is the creation (by an adversary) of a valid signature, $\sigma$, for any given message, $m$. An adversary capable of universal forgery is able to sign messages they chose themselves (as in selective forgery), messages chosen at random, or even specific messages provided by an opponent.

=== Selective forgery (selective unforgeability, SUF) ===
Selective forgery is the creation of a message/signature pair $(m, \sigma)$ by an adversary, where $m$ has been chosen by the attacker prior to the attack. $m$ may be chosen to have interesting mathematical properties with respect to the signature algorithm; however, in selective forgery, $m$ must be fixed before the start of the attack.

The ability to successfully conduct a selective forgery attack implies the ability to successfully conduct an existential forgery attack.

=== Existential forgery ===
Existential forgery (existential unforgeability, EUF) is the creation (by an adversary) of at least one message/signature pair, $(m, \sigma)$, where $m$ has never been signed by the legitimate signer. The adversary can choose $m$ freely; $m$ need not have any particular meaning; the message content is irrelevant — as long as the pair, $(m, \sigma)$, is valid, the adversary has succeeded in constructing an existential forgery. Thus, creating an existential forgery is easier than a selective forgery, because the attacker may select a message $m$ for which a forgery can easily be created. In contrast, in the case of a selective forgery, the challenger can ask for the signature of a “difficult” message.

==== Example of an existential forgery ====
The RSA cryptosystem has the following multiplicative property: $\sigma(m_1) \cdot \sigma(m_2) = \sigma (m_1 \cdot m_2)$.

This property can be exploited by creating a message $m' = m_1 \cdot m_2$ with a signature $\sigma\left(m'\right) = \sigma (m_1 \cdot m_2)= \sigma(m_1) \cdot \sigma(m_2)$.

A common defense to this attack is to hash the messages before signing them.

=== Weak existential forgery (strong existential unforgeability, strong unforgeability; sEUF, or SUF) ===
This notion is a stronger (more secure) variant of the existential forgery detailed above. Weak existential forgery is the creation (by an adversary) of at least one message/signature pair, $\left(m', \sigma'\right)$, given a number of different message-signature pairs $(m, \sigma)$ produced by the legitimate signer. In contrast to existential forgeries, an adversary is also considered successful if they manages to create a new signature for an already signed message $m'$.

Strong existential forgery is essentially the weakest adversarial goal. Therefore the strongest schemes are those that are strongly existentially unforgeable.
