= Message authentication =

System to verify the source and or authenticity of a message

In information security, message authentication or data origin authentication is a property that a message has not been modified while in transit (data integrity) and that the receiving party can verify the source of the message.

== Description ==
Message authentication or data origin authentication is an information security property that indicates that a message has not been modified while in transit (data integrity) and that the receiving party can verify the source of the message. Message authentication does not necessarily include the property of non-repudiation.

== Techniques ==
Message authentication is typically achieved by using message authentication codes (MACs), authenticated encryption (AE), or digital signatures. The message authentication code, also known as digital authenticator, is used as an integrity check based on a secret key shared by two parties to authenticate information transmitted between them. It is based on using a cryptographic hash or symmetric encryption algorithm. The authentication key is only shared by exactly two parties (e.g. communicating devices), and the authentication will fail in the existence of a third party possessing the key since the algorithm will no longer be able to detect forgeries (i.e. to be able to validate the unique source of the message). In addition, the key must also be randomly generated to avoid its recovery through brute-force searches and related-key attacks designed to identify it from the messages transiting the medium.

Some cryptographers distinguish between "message authentication without secrecy" systems – which allow the intended receiver to verify the source of the message, but they don't bother hiding the plaintext contents of the message – from authenticated encryption systems. Some cryptographers have researched subliminal channel systems that send messages that appear to use a "message authentication without secrecy" system, but in fact also transmit a secret message.

== Related concepts ==
Data origin authentication and non-repudiation have been also studied in the framework of quantum cryptography.

== See also ==
- Data integrity
- Authentication
- Deniable authentication
