= John Viega =

American computer security specialist

John Viega (born February 22, 1974) is an American computer security author, researcher and professional.

== Early life ==
John Viega earned his BA from the University of Virginia. As an undergraduate, he worked in Randy Pausch's Stage 3 Research Group, as an early contributor to Alice. Viega earned an MS in Computer Science, also from the University of Virginia.

While at the University of Virginia, Viega started a popular mailing list for the Dave Matthews Band. Frustrated by the maintenance costs for a large, active mailing list, he wrote the first version of GNU Mailman, which quickly took off, leading the shift of mailing list management from email commands to the web.

== Career ==
Viega co-authored Building Secure Software (Addison Wesley, 2001), which was the first book to teach developers about writing secure software. He has since co-authored a number of additional books on computer security, including Network Security with OpenSSL (O'Reilly, 2002), the Secure Programming Cookbook (O'Reilly, 2003), Beautiful Security (O'Reilly, 2009), and the 19 Deadly Sins of Software Security (McGraw Hill, 2005)

In 2005, he co-authored the widely used GCM mode of operation for AES, along with David A. McGrew, which was designed to provide both encryption and authentication with one primitive that is both cost-effective in hardware, and unencumbered by patents.

Viega was also a pioneer in static analysis for security vulnerabilities. He was responsible for ITS4, the first static analysis tool in this class. He co-founded Secure Software, the first commercial vendor for such tools, which also released an open source tool, Rough Auditing Tool for Security (RATS).

At the end of 2005, Viega left Secure Software and joined McAfee, first as Chief Security Architect, and later as CTO, SaaS. Secure Software was bought by Fortify Software just over a year later.

Post-McAfee, he was an executive at SilverSky, a cloud security provider funded by Goldman Sachs and Bessemer Venture Partners, which was acquired by BAE Systems in 2014, where he was Executive Vice President of Products and Engineering.

In 2016, he left to co-found Capsule8 with Dino Dai-Zovi and Brandon Edwards, which was acquired by Sophos in July 2021.

Viega was also the lead author of OWASP's CLASP, a lightweight process for relating software development to security. He is also a former editor-in-chief for the IEEE Security & Privacy Magazine. He has been an adjunct professor at Virginia Tech, and New York University.

Viega is currently the lead developer for the open source software provenance and observability tool, Chalk, as well as the co-founder and CEO of Crash Override.
