= Don Coppersmith =

American mathematician (born 1950)

- Born: 1950 (age 75–76)
- Education: Massachusetts Institute of Technology (B.S., 1972); Harvard University (M.S., 1975; Ph.D., 1977)
- Known for: Coppersmith–Winograd algorithm
- Awards: RSA Award for Excellence in Mathematics
- Scientific career
- Fields: Cryptography
- Workplaces: IBM, IDA/CCRP
- Thesis: Deformations of Lie Groups and Lie Algebras (1977)
- Doctoral advisor: John H. Hubbard; Shlomo Sternberg

Don Coppersmith (born c. 1950) is a cryptographer and mathematician. He was involved in the design of the Data Encryption Standard block cipher at IBM, particularly the design of the S-boxes, strengthening them against differential cryptanalysis. He also improved the quantum Fourier transform discovered by Peter Shor in the same year (1994). He has also worked on algorithms for computing discrete logarithms, the cryptanalysis of RSA, methods for rapid matrix multiplication (see Coppersmith–Winograd algorithm) and IBM's MARS cipher. He is also a co-designer of the SEAL and Scream ciphers.

In 1972, Coppersmith obtained a bachelor's degree in mathematics at the Massachusetts Institute of Technology, and a Masters and Ph.D. in mathematics from Harvard University in 1975 and 1977 respectively. He was a Putnam Fellow each year from 1968–1971, becoming the first four-time Putnam Fellow in history. In 1998, he started Ponder This, an online monthly column on mathematical puzzles and problems. In October 2005, the column was taken over by James Shearer. Around that same time, he left IBM and began working at the IDA Center for Communications Research, Princeton.

In 2002, Coppersmith won the RSA Award for Excellence in Mathematics.

In 2022, Coppersmith was awarded the Levchin Prize for “foundational innovations in cryptanalysis” .

== See also ==
- Coppersmith's attack
- Coppersmith method
