= John Black (cryptographer) =

American cryptographer and security researcher

John Richard Black, Jr. is a cryptologist, programmer, and professor of computer science at the University of Colorado Boulder focusing on computer security. He graduated with a BA in computer science from CSU East Bay in 1988 and completed his PhD in cryptography at UC Davis with Phillip Rogaway in 2000. He has taught at CU-Boulder since 2002.

Black has been involved in the invention of several cryptographic algorithms including UMAC, PMAC, OCB, and CMAC as well as algorithms related to Format Preserving Encryption. In 2004, he worked with students Martin Cochran and Ryan Gardner to defeat the security mechanisms of the Internet Chess Club.
