= Schroeppel =

Schroeppel may refer to:

- Schroeppel, New York
- Richard Schroeppel, American mathematician
