= Levchin Prize =

- Awarded for: “major innovations in cryptography that have had a significant impact on the practice of cryptography and its use in real-world systems”
- Sponsored by: Max Levchin
- Presented by: Real World Crypto steering committee
- Reward: $10,000
- First award: 2016-01-06
- Website: rwc.iacr.org/LevchinPrize/

The Levchin Prize for real-world cryptography is a prize given to people or organizations who are recognized for contributions to cryptography that have a significant impact on its practical use. The recipients are selected by the steering committee of the Real World Crypto (RWC) academic conference run by the International Association for Cryptologic Research (IACR) and announced at the RWC conference.

The award was established in 2015 by Max Levchin, a software engineer and businessman who co-founded the financial technology company PayPal, and first awarded in January 2016.

Two awards are presented every year, each on its own topic. While there is no formal rule, as of 2024 one of the two awards has recognized one or more individuals for theoretical advancements to cryptographic methods with a practical impact, while the other has recognized one or more individuals or an organization for either the construction of practical systems or practical advancements in cryptanalysis.

== Recipients ==
The following table lists the recipients of the Levchin Prize.

Levchin Prize winners
Year	Recipient(s)	Contribution
2016	Phil Rogaway	“For groundbreaking practice-oriented research that has had exceptional impact on real-world cryptography.” This includes work on authenticated encryption and format-preserving encryption.
2016	The miTLS team: Cedric Fournet, Karthikeyan Bhargavan, Alfredo Pironti, and Markulf Kohlweiss	“For the analysis of TLS and the development of the miTLS project.”
2017	Joan Daemen	“For the development of AES and SHA3.”
2017	Moxie Marlinspike and Trevor Perrin	“For the development and wide deployment of the Signal protocol.”
2018	Hugo Krawczyk	“For the development of real-world cryptographic systems with strong security guarantees and proofs.” This includes work on IPsec, IKE, SSL/TLS, HMAC and HKDF.
2018	The OpenSSL team	“For dramatic improvements to the code quality of OpenSSL.”
2019	Mihir Bellare	“For outstanding contributions to the design and analysis of real-world cryptosystems, including the development of the random oracle model, modes of operation, HMAC, and models for key exchange.”
2019	Eric Rescorla	“For sustained contributions to the standardization of security protocols, and most recently the development and standardization of TLS 1.3.” Other work includes earlier versions of TLS and DTLS, WebRTC, ACME and QUIC, as well as co-founding Let's Encrypt.
2020	Ralph Merkle	“For fundamental contributions to the development of public key cryptography, hash algorithms, Merkle trees, and digital signatures.”
2020	Xiaoyun Wang and Marc Stevens	“For groundbreaking work on the security of collision resistant hash functions.”
2021	Neal Koblitz and Victor Miller	“For the invention of elliptic curve cryptography.”
2021	The Tor Project	“For continued development of the Tor system and the underlying cryptography.”
2022	Don Coppersmith	“For foundational innovations in cryptanalysis.”
2022	Let's Encrypt	“For fundamental improvements to the certificate ecosystem that provide free certificates for all.”
2023	Vincent Rijmen	“For co-designing the Advanced Encryption Standard (AES).”
2023	Paul Kocher	“For pioneering work on side channel analysis.”
2024	Anna Lysyanskaya and Jan Camenisch	“For the development of efficient Anonymous Credentials”
2024	Al Cutter, Emilia Käsper, Adam Langley, and Ben Laurie	“For creating and deploying Certificate Transparency at scale”
2025	Adi Shamir	“For foundational contributions to symmetric and public key cryptography, cryptographic protocols, and the cryptanalysis of real-world ciphers.”
2025	Emmanuel Thomé, Pierrick Gaudry, Paul Zimmermann	“For developing CADO-NFS, an implementation of the Number Field Sieve for factorization and discrete log, and for continued factorizations and discrete log records.”
2026	Whitfield Diffie and Martin Hellman	“For the invention of public key cryptography.”
2026	David Basin, Cas Cremers, Jannik Dreier, Ralf Sasse	“For developing the Tamarin prover, and its use in the analysis of real world security protocols.”

== See also ==
- List of computer science awards
