= ROCA vulnerability =

Cryptographic vulnerability found in 2017

CVE-2017-15361
- CVSS 3.x score: 5.9
- CVSS 3.x vector: CVSS:3.0/AV:N/AC:H/PR:N/UI:N/S:U/C:H/I:N/A:N
- Date discovered: February 2017; 9 years ago
- Discoverer: Matúš Nemec, Marek Sýs, et al. (Masaryk University)
- Affected hardware: TPMs, YubiKeys, Gemalto IDPrime .NET smart cards
- Affected software: Any asymmetric encryption that used RSALib, including BitLocker and PGP

The ROCA vulnerability is a cryptographic weakness that allows the private key of a key pair to be recovered from the public key in keys generated by devices with the vulnerability. "ROCA" is an acronym for "Return of Coppersmith's attack". The vulnerability has been given the identifier CVE-2017-15361.

The vulnerability arises from an approach to RSA key generation used in vulnerable versions of the software library RSALib provided by Infineon Technologies and incorporated into many smart cards, Trusted Platform Modules (TPM), and Hardware Security Modules (HSM), including YubiKey 4 tokens when used to generate RSA keys on-chip for OpenPGP or PIV. RSA keys of lengths 512, 1024, and 2048 bits generated using these versions of the Infineon library are vulnerable to a practical ROCA attack. The research team that discovered the attack (all with Masaryk University and led by Matúš Nemec and Marek Sýs) estimate that it affected around one-quarter of all TPM devices globally.

The team informed Infineon of the RSALib problem in February 2017, but withheld public notice until mid-October, citing responsible disclosure. At that time they announced the attack and provided a tool to test public keys for vulnerability. They published the details of the attack in November.

== Technical details ==
Generating an RSA key involves selecting two large randomly-generated prime numbers, a process that can be time-consuming, particularly on small devices, such as smart cards. In addition to being primes, the numbers should have certain other properties for best security. The vulnerable RSALib selection process quickly creates primes of the desired type by only considering numbers of the form
$$k \times M + (65537^a \bmod M),$$
where $M$ is the product of the first n successive primes (2, 3, 5, 7, 11, 13, ...), and n is a constant that only depends on the desired key size. The security is based on the secret constants $k$ and $a$. The ROCA attack exploits this particular format for primes using a variation of the Coppersmith method. In addition, public keys generated this way have a distinctive fingerprint that can be quickly recognized by attempting to compute the discrete logarithm of the public key mod $M$ to base 65537. Computing discrete logarithms in a large group is usually extremely difficult, but in this case it can be done efficiently using the Pohlig–Hellman algorithm because $M$ is a smooth number. A test site is available on the Internet. In short, keys that fit this format have significantly lower entropy and can be attacked relatively efficiently (weeks to months), and the format can be confirmed ("fingerprinted") by the attacker very quickly (microseconds). Multiple implementations of the attack are publicly available.

== Mitigation ==
The ROCA authors consider public keys of length 512, 1024 and 2048-bits generated by RSALib to be vulnerable. Because the details of key generation differ for different key lengths, shorter keys are not necessarily more vulnerable than longer keys. For example, a 1952-bit RSAlib key is stronger than a 2048-bit key and a 4096-bit key is weaker than a 3072-bit key.

The best mitigation, according to the authors, is to generate RSA keys using a stronger method, such as by OpenSSL. If that is not possible, the ROCA authors suggest using key lengths that are less susceptible to ROCA such as 3936-bit, 3072-bit or, if there is a 2048-bit key size maximum, 1952-bits.

Infineon has released firmware updates for its Trusted Platform Modules to manufacturers who have used its TPMs.

== Implications ==
The vulnerability highlighted several shortcomings of the Common Criteria certification scheme as the vulnerability was present in a list of Common Criteria certified smart card products. Namely, the approval of homegrown cryptographic algorithms; the lack of transparency in certification reports, inability to revoke Common Criteria certificates for known vulnerable products and distribute this information to the users of the certified products.

In Estonia, the discovery of the vulnerability resulted in a state-level cyber crisis as the vulnerable smart card chip was deployed on more than 750,000 Estonian identity cards that are used daily by Estonian residents and e-residents to securely authenticate online and create digital signatures.

== See also ==
- BitLocker § Security concerns
- Infineon Technologies § Security flaw
- Trusted Platform Module
