= PMAC =

PMAC may refer to:

- Permanent Magnet AC Motor, a type of electric motor that uses permanent magnets in addition to windings on its field, rather than windings only.
- PMAC (cryptography), a message authentication code algorithm
- Pete Maravich Assembly Center, Louisiana State University
- Provisional Military Administrative Council or Derg, a military junta that ruled Ethiopia 1974—1987
- Prevention and Management of Abortion and Its Complications, a Philippine government policy concerning abortion in the Philippines
- Purchasing Management Association of Canada, a co-sponsor of the Ivey Index
- "Problem exists between monitor and chair", a term describing computer user error
