= Mihir Bellare =

Cryptographer

- Occupation: Professor
- Board member of: San Diego Privacy Advisory Board
- Awards: Paris Kanellakis Award; Levchin Prize; ACM Fellow

Academic background
- Education: California Institute of Technology (BS); Massachusetts Institute of Technology (PhD)
- Thesis: Randomness in Interactive Proofs (1991)
- Doctoral advisor: Silvio Micali

Academic work
- Discipline: Computer science
- Sub-discipline: Cryptography
- Institutions: University of California San Diego
- Notable ideas: Random oracle model

Mihir Bellare is a cryptographer and professor at the University of California San Diego. He holds a Bachelor of Science degree from the California Institute of Technology and a Ph.D. from the Massachusetts Institute of Technology. He has published several seminal papers in the field of cryptography (notably in the area of provable security), many of which were co-written with Phillip Rogaway. Bellare has published a number of papers in the field of Format-Preserving Encryption. His students include Michel Abdalla, Chanathip Namprempre, Tadayoshi Kohno and Anton Mityagin. Bellare is one of the authors of skein.

In 2003, Bellare was a recipient of RSA Conference's Sixth Annual Award for outstanding contributions in the field of mathematics for his research in cryptography. In 2013 he became a Fellow of the Association for Computing Machinery. In 2019 he was awarded Levchin Prize for Real-World Cryptography for his outstanding contributions to the design and analysis of real-world cryptosystems, including the development of random oracle model, modes of operation, HMAC, and models for key exchange.

Bellare's papers cover topics including:

- HMAC
- Random oracle
- OAEP
- Probabilistic signature scheme
- Provable security
- Format-preserving encryption
- Authenticated encryption
- Garbled circuits
- Multi-signatures
- Forward-secure digital signatures
- Threshold signatures
- Deterministic encryption
- Searchable encryption
- Hedged public-key encryption
- Related-key attacks
- Group signatures
- Key-dependent message security
- Message-locked encryption and secure deduplication
- Ratcheted encryption
- Identity-based encryption
- Non-malleable encryption
- Proofs of knowledge
- Pseudorandom functions
- CBC MAC security
- Code-based game-playing proofs
- Concrete security of symmetric encryption
- Algorithm-substitution attacks
- Authenticated key exchange
- Blind signatures
- Incremental cryptography
- Secret sharing
- Obfuscation
- OCB mode of operation
- Probabilistically checkable proofs
- Zero-knowledge proofs
- Fiat-Shamir transform
- Password-based encryption
- Multi-user security
- Robust encryption
- Universal Computational Extractors (UCE)
- Big-key cryptography
- Chameleon hash functions
- Wiretap channel
- Functional encryption
- Electronic payment systems
- Batch verification

On September 14, 2022, Bellare was appointed by the mayor of San Diego to the city's Privacy Advisory Board.
