= SANDstorm hash =

Cryptographic hash function

SANDstorm
General
- Designers: Mark Torgerson, Richard Schroeppel, Tim Draelos, Nathan Dautenhahn, Sean Malone, Andrea Walker, Michael Collins, Hilarie Orman,
- First published: 2008

Detail
- Digest sizes: 224, 256, 384, 512 bits

Best public cryptanalysis

The SANDstorm hash is a cryptographic hash function designed in 2008 by Mark Torgerson, Richard Schroeppel, Tim Draelos, Nathan Dautenhahn, Sean Malone, Andrea Walker, Michael Collins, and Hilarie Orman for the NIST SHA-3 competition.

The SANDstorm hash was accepted into the first round of the NIST hash function competition, but was not accepted into the second round.

== Architecture ==
The hash function has an explicit key schedule. It uses an 8-bit by 8-bit S-box. The hash function can be parallelized on a large range of platforms using multi-core processing.

Both SANDstorm-256 and SANDstorm-512 run more than twice as slowly as SHA-2 as measured by cpb.

As of 2009, no collision attack or preimage attack against SANDstorm is known which is better than the trivial birthday attack or long second preimage attack.
