= Probabilistic signature scheme =

Signature padding scheme for RSA

Probabilistic Signature Scheme (PSS) is a cryptographic signature scheme designed by Mihir Bellare and Phillip Rogaway.

RSA-PSS is an adaptation of their work and is standardized as part of PKCS#1 v2.1. In general, RSA-PSS should be used as a replacement for RSA-PKCS#1 v1.5.

== Design ==
PSS was specifically developed to allow modern methods of security analysis to prove that its security directly relates to that of the RSA problem. There is no such proof for the traditional PKCS#1 v1.5 scheme.

== Implementations ==
- OpenSSL
- wolfSSL
- GnuTLS
