= PMAC (cryptography) =

Message authentication code algorithm

PMAC, which stands for parallelizable MAC, is a message authentication code algorithm. It was created by Phillip Rogaway. PMAC is a method of taking a block cipher and creating an efficient message authentication code that is reducible in security to the underlying block cipher.

PMAC is similar in functionality to the OMAC algorithm.

== Patents ==
PMAC is no longer patented and can be used royalty-free. It was originally patented by Phillip Rogaway, but he has since abandoned his patent filings.
