= SEAL (cipher) =

Stream cipher

In cryptography, SEAL (Software-Optimized Encryption Algorithm) is a stream cipher optimised for machines with a 32-bit word size and plenty of RAM with a reported performance of around 4 cycles per byte. SEAL is actually a pseudorandom function family in that it can easily generate arbitrary portions of the keystream without having to start from the beginning. This makes it particularly well suited for applications like encrypting hard drives.

The first version was published by Phillip Rogaway and Don Coppersmith in 1994. The current version, published in 1997, is 3.0. SEAL, covered by two patents in the United States, both of which are assigned to IBM.
