= Richard Schroeppel =

American mathematician

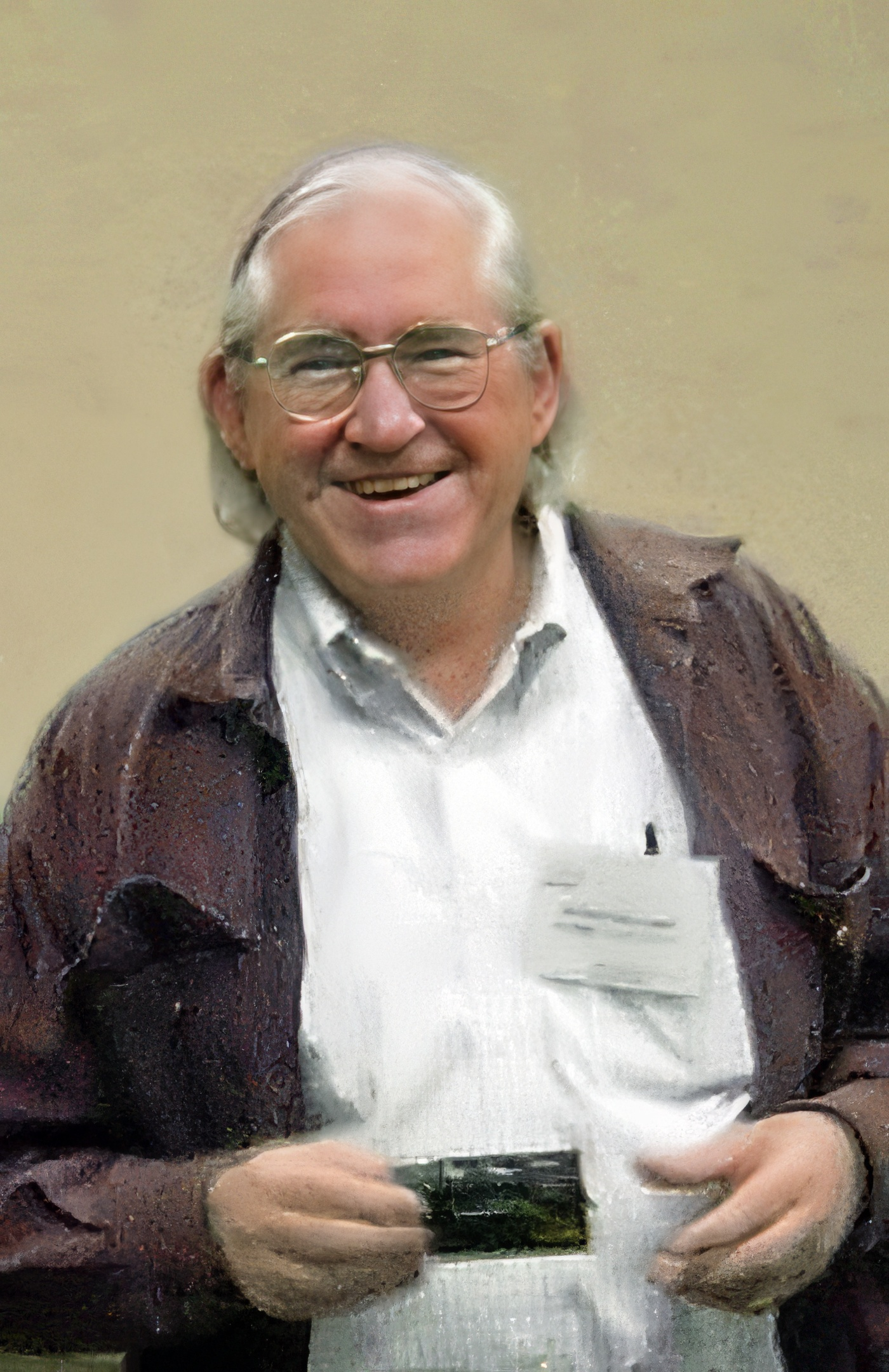
- Born: 1948 (age 77–78); Illinois
- Education: MIT
- Awards: IACR Fellow (2011); Putnam Fellow (1966, 1967)
- Scientific career
- Fields: Mathematics
- Workplaces: University of Arizona

Richard C. Schroeppel (born 1948) is an American mathematician born in Illinois. His research has included magic squares, elliptic curves, and cryptography. In 1964, Schroeppel won first place in the United States among over 225,000 high school students in the Annual High School Mathematics Examination, a contest sponsored by the Mathematical Association of America and the Society of Actuaries. In both 1966 and 1967, Schroeppel scored among the top 5 in the U.S. in the William Lowell Putnam Mathematical Competition. In 1973 he discovered that there are 275,305,224 normal magic squares of order 5. In 1998–1999 he designed the Hasty Pudding Cipher, which was a candidate for the Advanced Encryption Standard, and he is one of the designers of the SANDstorm hash, a submission to the NIST SHA-3 competition.

Among other contributions, Schroeppel was the first to recognize the sub-exponential running time of certain integer factoring algorithms. While not entirely rigorous, his proof that Morrison and Brillhart's continued fraction factoring algorithm ran in roughly $e^{\sqrt{2 \ln{n} \ln{\ln{n}}}}$ steps was an important milestone in factoring and laid a foundation for much later work, including the current "champion" factoring algorithm, the number field sieve.

Schroeppel analyzed Morrison and Brillhart's algorithm, and saw how to cut the run time to roughly $e^{\sqrt{\ln{n} \ln{\ln{n}} }}$ by modifications that allowed sieving. This improvement doubled the size of numbers that could be factored in a given amount of time. Coming around the time of the RSA algorithm, which depends on the difficulty of factoring for its security, this was a critically important result.

Due to Schroeppel's apparent prejudice against publishing (though he freely circulated his ideas within the research community), and in spite of Carl Pomerance noting that his quadratic sieve factoring algorithm owed a debt to Schroeppel's earlier work, Schroeppel's contribution is often overlooked.

Schroeppel's Erdős number is 2.

== See also ==
- HAKMEM
- Counter machine
