= One-key MAC =

Message authentication code algorithm

One-key MAC (OMAC) is a family of message authentication codes constructed from a block cipher much like the CBC-MAC algorithm. It may be used to provide assurance of the authenticity and, hence, the integrity of data. Two versions are defined:

- The original OMAC of February 2003, which is rarely used. The preferred name is now "OMAC2".
- The OMAC1 refinement, which became an NIST recommendation in May 2005 under the name CMAC.

OMAC is free for all uses: it is not covered by any patents.

== History ==
The core of the CMAC algorithm is a variation of CBC-MAC that Black and Rogaway proposed and analyzed under the name "XCBC" and submitted to NIST. The XCBC algorithm efficiently addresses the security deficiencies of CBC-MAC, but requires three keys.

Iwata and Kurosawa proposed an improvement of XCBC that requires less key material (just one key) and named the resulting algorithm One-Key CBC-MAC (OMAC) in their papers. They later submitted the OMAC1 (= CMAC), a refinement of OMAC, and additional security analysis.

== Algorithm ==
To generate an ℓ-bit CMAC tag (t) of a message (m) using a b-bit block cipher (E) and a secret key (k), one first generates two b-bit sub-keys (k_{1} and k_{2}) using the following algorithm (this is equivalent to multiplication by x and x^{2} in a finite field GF(2^{b})). Let ≪ denote the standard left-shift operator and ⊕ denote bit-wise exclusive or:

1. Calculate a temporary value k_{0} = E_{k}(0).
2. If msb(k_{0}) = 0, then k_{1} = k_{0} ≪ 1, else k_{1} = (k_{0} ≪ 1) ⊕ C; where C is a certain constant that depends only on b. (Specifically, C is the non-leading coefficients of the lexicographically first irreducible degree-b binary polynomial with the minimal number of ones: 0x1B for 64-bit, 0x87 for 128-bit, and 0x425 for 256-bit blocks.)
3. If msb(k_{1}) = 0, then k_{2} = k_{1} ≪ 1, else k_{2} = (k_{1} ≪ 1) ⊕ C.
4. Return keys (k_{1}, k_{2}) for the MAC generation process.

As a small example, suppose b = 4, C = 0011_{2}, and k_{0} = E_{k}(0) = 0101_{2}. Then k_{1} = 1010_{2} and k_{2} = 0100 ⊕ 0011 = 0111_{2}.

The CMAC tag generation process is as follows:

1. Divide message into b-bit blocks m = m_{1} ∥ ... ∥ m_{n−1} ∥ m_{n}, where m_{1}, ..., m_{n−1} are complete blocks. (The empty message is treated as one incomplete block.)
2. If m_{n} is a complete block then m_{n}′ = k_{1} ⊕ m_{n} else m_{n}′ = k_{2} ⊕ (m_{n} ∥ 10...0_{2}).
3. Let c_{0} = 00...0_{2}.
4. For i = 1, ..., n − 1, calculate c_{i} = E_{k}(c_{i−1} ⊕ m_{i}).
5. c_{n} = E_{k}(c_{n−1} ⊕ m_{n}′)
6. Output t = msb_{ℓ}(c_{n}).

The verification process is as follows:

1. Use the above algorithm to generate the tag.
2. Check that the generated tag is equal to the received tag.

== Variants ==
CMAC-C1 is a variant of CMAC that provides additional commitment and context-discovery security guarantees.

== Implementations ==
- Python implementation: see the usage of the AES_CMAC() function in "impacket/blob/master/tests/misc/test_crypto.py", and its definition in "impacket/blob/master/impacket/crypto.py"
- Ruby implementation
