= Phillip Rogaway =

American university professor

Phillip Rogaway (also referred to as Phil Rogaway) is an American cryptographer and former professor of computer science at the University of California, Davis. He graduated from Beverly Hills High School, and later earned a BA in computer science from UC Berkeley and completed his PhD in cryptography at MIT, in the Theory of Computation group. He has taught at UC Davis since 1994. He was awarded the Paris Kanellakis Award in 2009 and the first Levchin Prize for Real World Cryptography in 2016. Rogaway received an NSF CAREER award in 1996, which the NSA had attempted to prevent by influencing the NSF.

He has been interviewed in multiple media outlets regarding his stance on the ethical obligations that cryptographers and computer scientists have to serve to the public good, specifically in the areas of internet privacy and digital surveillance.

Rogaway's papers cover topics including:

- CMAC
- Concrete security
- DES and DES-X
- Format-preserving encryption
- OCB mode
- Random oracle model
- SEAL
- UMAC
- Zero-knowledge proofs
