= List of hash functions =

This is a list of hash functions, including cyclic redundancy checks, checksum functions, and cryptographic hash functions.

== Cyclic redundancy checks ==
Name	Length	Type
cksum (Unix)	32 bits	CRC with length appended
CRC-8	8 bits	CRC
CRC-16	16 bits	CRC
CRC-32	32 bits	CRC
CRC-64	64 bits	CRC

Adler-32 is often mistaken for a CRC, but it is not: it is a checksum.

== Checksums ==
Name	Length	Type
BSD checksum (Unix)	16 bits	sum with circular rotation
SYSV checksum (Unix)	16 bits	sum with circular rotation
sum8	8 bits	sum
Internet Checksum	16 bits	sum (ones' complement)
sum24	24 bits	sum
sum32	32 bits	sum
fletcher-4	4 bits	sum
fletcher-8	8 bits	sum
fletcher-16	16 bits	sum
fletcher-32	32 bits	sum
Adler-32	32 bits	sum
xor8	8 bits	sum
Luhn algorithm	1 decimal digit	sum
Verhoeff algorithm	1 decimal digit	sum
Damm algorithm	1 decimal digit	Quasigroup operation

== Universal hash function families ==
Name	Length	Type
Rabin fingerprint	variable	multiply
tabulation hashing	variable	XOR
universal one-way hash function		
Zobrist hashing	variable	XOR

== Non-cryptographic hash functions ==
Name	Length	Type
Pearson hashing	8 bits (or more)	XOR/table
Paul Hsieh's SuperFastHash	32 bits	
Buzhash	variable	XOR/table
Fowler–Noll–Vo hash function (FNV hash)	32, 64, 128, 256, 512, or 1024 bits	xor/product or product/XOR
Jenkins hash function	32 or 64 bits	XOR/addition
Bernstein's hash djb2	32 or 64 bits	shift/add or mult/add or shift/add/xor or mult/xor
PJW hash / ELF hash	32 or 64 bits	add,shift,xor
MurmurHash	32, 64, or 128 bits	product/rotation
Fast-Hash	32 or 64 bits	xorshift operations
SpookyHash	32, 64, or 128 bits	see Jenkins hash function
CityHash	32, 64, 128, or 256 bits	
FarmHash	32, 64 or 128 bits	
MetroHash	64 or 128 bits	
numeric hash (nhash)	variable	division/modulo
xxHash	32, 64 or 128 bits	product/rotation
t1ha (Fast Positive Hash)	64 or 128 bits	product/rotation/XOR/add
GxHash	32, 64 or 128 bits	AES block cipher
pHash	fixed or variable	see Perceptual hashing
dhash	128 bits	see Perceptual hashing
SDBM	32 or 64 bits	mult/add or shift/add also used in GNU AWK
OSDB hash	64 bits	add
komihash	64 bits	product/split/add/XOR
Falkhash	128 bits	
Intrinhash	256 bits	
AquaHash	128 bits	
MeiHash	128 bits	
wifehash	128 bits	MeiHash variant, uses alternating dual mixers. Faster than xxh3-128 on bulk throughput.

== Keyed cryptographic hash functions ==
Name	Tag Length	Type
BLAKE2		keyed hash function (prefix-MAC)
BLAKE3	256 bits	keyed hash function (supplied IV)
HMAC		
KMAC	arbitrary	based on Keccak
MD6	up to 512 bits	Merkle tree NLFSR (it is also an unkeyed hash function)
One-key MAC (OMAC; CMAC)		
PMAC (cryptography)		
Poly1305-AES	128 bits	nonce-based
SipHash	32, 64 or 128 bits	non-collision-resistant PRF
HighwayHash	64, 128 or 256 bits	non-collision-resistant PRF
UMAC		
VMAC		

== Unkeyed cryptographic hash functions ==
Name	Length	Type
BLAKE-256	256 bits	HAIFA structure
BLAKE-512	512 bits	HAIFA structure
BLAKE2s	up to 256 bits	HAIFA structure
BLAKE2b	up to 512 bits	HAIFA structure
BLAKE2X	arbitrary	HAIFA structure, extendable-output functions (XOFs) design
BLAKE3	arbitrary	Merkle tree
ECOH	224 to 512 bits	hash
FSB	160 to 512 bits	hash
GOST	256 bits	hash
Grøstl	up to 512 bits	hash
HAS-160	160 bits	hash
HAVAL	128 to 256 bits	hash
JH	224 to 512 bits	hash
LSH	256 to 512 bits	wide-pipe Merkle–Damgård construction
MD2	128 bits	hash
MD4	128 bits	hash
MD5	128 bits	Merkle–Damgård construction
MD6	up to 512 bits	Merkle tree NLFSR (it is also a keyed hash function)
RadioGatún	arbitrary	ideal mangling function
RIPEMD	128 bits	hash
RIPEMD-128	128 bits	hash
RIPEMD-160	160 bits	hash
RIPEMD-256	256 bits	hash
RIPEMD-320	320 bits	hash
SHA-1	160 bits	Merkle–Damgård construction
SHA-224	224 bits	Merkle–Damgård construction
SHA-256	256 bits	Merkle–Damgård construction
SHA-384	384 bits	Merkle–Damgård construction
SHA-512	512 bits	Merkle–Damgård construction
SHA-3 (subset of Keccak)	arbitrary	sponge function
Skein	arbitrary	Unique Block Iteration
Snefru	128 or 256 bits	hash
Spectral Hash	512 bits	wide-pipe Merkle–Damgård construction
Streebog	256 or 512 bits	Merkle–Damgård construction
SWIFFT	512 bits	hash
Tiger	192 bits	Merkle–Damgård construction
Whirlpool	512 bits	hash

== See also ==
- Hash function security summary
- Secure Hash Algorithms
- NIST hash function competition
- Key derivation functions (category)
