= MD-4 =

MD4 or MD 4 or MD-4 can refer to:

- MD4
- Maryland's 4th congressional district
- Maryland Route 4
