= MD-6 =

MD-6 or MD6 may refer to:

- MD6, a cryptographic hash function
- Maryland's 6th congressional district
- Maryland Route 6
