= MD 4 =

MD4, MD 4, MD-4 may refer to:

- MD4 cryptographic hash function
- Maryland's 4th congressional district
- Maryland Route 4
