= MD5CRK =

Volunteer computing project aimed at finding a MD5 collision

In cryptography, MD5CRK was a volunteer computing effort (similar to distributed.net) launched by Jean-Luc Cooke and his company, CertainKey Cryptosystems, to demonstrate that the MD5 message digest algorithm is insecure by finding a collision – two messages that produce the same MD5 hash. The project went live on March 1, 2004. The project ended on August 24, 2004, after researchers independently demonstrated a technique for generating collisions in MD5 using analytical methods by Xiaoyun Wang, Feng, Xuejia Lai, and Yu. CertainKey awarded a 10,000 Canadian Dollar prize to Wang, Feng, Lai and Yu for their discovery.

Pollard's Rho collision search for a single path

A technique called Floyd's cycle-finding algorithm was used to try to find a collision for MD5. The algorithm can be described by analogy with a random walk. Using the principle that any function with a finite number of possible outputs placed in a feedback loop will cycle, one can use a relatively small amount of memory to store outputs with particular structures and use them as "markers" to better detect when a marker has been "passed" before. These markers are called distinguished points, the point where two inputs produce the same output is called a collision point. MD5CRK considered any point whose first 32 bits were zeroes to be a distinguished point.

== Complexity ==
The expected time to find a collision is not equal to $2^{N}$ where $N$ is the number of bits in the digest output. It is in fact $2^N! \over {(2^N - K)! \times {2^N}^K}$, where $K$ is the number of function outputs collected.

For this project, the probability of success after $K$ MD5 computations can be approximated by: $1 \over { 1 - e^{K \times (1-K) \over 2^{N+1} } }$.

The expected number of computations required to produce a collision in the 128-bit MD5 message digest function is thus: ${1.17741 \times 2^{N/2}} = {1.17741 \times 2^{64}}$

To give some perspective to this, using Virginia Tech's System X with a maximum performance of 12.25 Teraflops, it would take approximately ${2.17 \times 10^{19} / 12.25 \times 10^{12} \approx 1,770,000}$ seconds or about 3 weeks. Or for commodity processors at 2 gigaflops it would take 6,000 machines approximately the same amount of time.

== See also ==
- List of volunteer computing projects
- Brute force attack
