= Yuliang Zheng =

American educator

Yuliang Zheng, Ph.D., is Professor and Chair of the Department of Computer Science at the University of Alabama at Birmingham. He is best known for inventing the signcryption cryptographic primitive that combines the digital signature and encryption operations into one single step. He also invented the HAVAL hash function, SPEED cipher, and STRANDOM pseudo-random number generator.

Zheng is Chief Technology Officer of Calyptix Security, a company he co-founded in 2002.
