= Hash function security summary =

Publicly known attacks against cryptographic hash functions

This article summarizes publicly known attacks against cryptographic hash functions. Note that not all entries may be up to date. For a summary of other hash function parameters, see comparison of cryptographic hash functions.

== Table color key ==
No attack successfully demonstrated — attack only breaks a reduced version of the hash or requires more work than the claimed security level of the hash
Attack demonstrated in theory — attack breaks all rounds and has lower complexity than security claim
Attack demonstrated in practice — complexity is low enough to be actually used

== Common hash functions ==
=== Collision resistance ===
Hash function	Security claim	Best attack	Publish date	Comment
MD5	2^{64}	2^{18} time	2013-03-25	This attack takes seconds on a regular PC. Two-block collisions in 2^{18}, single-block collisions in 2^{41}.
SHA-1	2^{80}	2^{61.2}	2020-01-08	Paper by Gaëtan Leurent and Thomas Peyrin
SHA256	2^{128}	31 of 64 rounds (2^{65.5})	2013-05-28	Two-block collision.
SHA512	2^{256}	24 of 80 rounds (2^{32.5})	2008-11-25	Paper.
SHA-3	Up to 2^{512}	6 of 24 rounds (2^{50})	2017	Paper.
BLAKE2s	2^{128}	2.5 of 10 rounds (2^{112})	2009-05-26	Paper.
BLAKE2b	2^{256}	2.5 of 12 rounds (2^{224})	2009-05-26	Paper.

=== Chosen prefix collision attack ===
Hash function	Security claim	Best attack	Publish date	Comment
MD5	2^{64}	2^{39}	2009-06-16	This attack takes hours on a regular PC.
SHA-1	2^{80}	2^{63.4}	2020-01-08	Paper by Gaëtan Leurent and Thomas Peyrin
SHA256	2^{128}			
SHA512	2^{256}			
SHA-3	Up to 2^{512}			
BLAKE2s	2^{128}			
BLAKE2b	2^{256}			

=== Preimage resistance ===
Hash function	Security claim	Best attack	Publish date	Comment
MD5	2^{128}	2^{123.4}	2009-04-27	Paper.
SHA-1	2^{160}	45 of 80 rounds	2008-08-17	Paper.
SHA256	2^{256}	43 of 64 rounds (2^{254.9} time, 2^{6} memory)	2009-12-10	Paper.
SHA512	2^{512}	46 of 80 rounds (2^{511.5} time, 2^{6} memory)	2008-11-25	Paper, updated version.
SHA-3	Up to 2^{512}			
BLAKE2s	2^{256}	2.5 of 10 rounds (2^{241})	2009-05-26	Paper.
BLAKE2b	2^{512}	2.5 of 12 rounds (2^{481})	2009-05-26	Paper.

=== Length extension ===
- Vulnerable: MD5, SHA1, SHA256, SHA512
- Not vulnerable: SHA384, SHA-3, BLAKE2

== Less-common hash functions ==
=== Collision resistance ===
Hash function	Security claim	Best attack	Publish date	Comment
GOST	2^{128}	2^{105}	2008-08-18	Paper.
HAVAL-128	2^{64}	2^{7}	2004-08-17	Collisions originally reported in 2004, followed up by cryptanalysis paper in 2005.
MD2	2^{64}	2^{63.3} time, 2^{52} memory	2009	Slightly less computationally expensive than a birthday attack, but for practical purposes, memory requirements make it more expensive.
MD4	2^{64}	3 operations	2007-03-22	Finding collisions almost as fast as verifying them.
PANAMA	2^{128}	2^{6}	2007-04-04	Paper, improvement of an earlier theoretical attack from 2001.
RIPEMD (original)	2^{64}	2^{18} time	2004-08-17	Collisions originally reported in 2004, followed up by cryptanalysis paper in 2005.
RadioGatún	Up to 2^{608}	2^{704}	2008-12-04	For a word size w between 1-64 bits, the hash provides a security claim of 2^{9.5w}. The attack can find a collision in 2^{11w} time.
RIPEMD-160	2^{80}	48 of 80 rounds (2^{51} time)	2006	Paper.
SHA-0	2^{80}	2^{33.6} time	2008-02-11	Two-block collisions using boomerang attack. Attack takes estimated 1 hour on an average PC.
Streebog	2^{256}	9.5 rounds of 12 (2^{176} time, 2^{128} memory)	2013-09-10	Rebound attack.
Whirlpool	2^{256}	4.5 of 10 rounds (2^{120} time)	2009-02-24	Rebound attack.

=== Preimage resistance ===
Hash function	Security claim	Best attack	Publish date	Comment
GOST	2^{256}	2^{192}	2008-08-18	Paper.
MD2	2^{128}	2^{73} time, 2^{73} memory	2008	Paper.
MD4	2^{128}	2^{102} time, 2^{33} memory	2008-02-10	Paper.
RIPEMD (original)	2^{128}	35 of 48 rounds	2011	Paper.
RIPEMD-128	2^{128}	35 of 64 rounds	2011	Paper.
RIPEMD-160	2^{160}	31 of 80 rounds	2011	Paper.
Streebog	2^{512}	2^{266} time, 2^{259} data	2014-08-29	The paper presents two second-preimage attacks with variable data requirements.
Tiger	2^{192}	2^{188.8} time, 2^{8} memory	2010-12-06	Paper.

== Attacks on hashed passwords ==
Hashes described here are designed for fast computation and have roughly similar speeds. Because most users typically choose short passwords formed in predictable ways, passwords can often be recovered from their hashed value if a fast hash is used. Searches on the order of 100 billion tests per second are possible with high-end graphics processors. Special hashes called key derivation functions have been created to slow brute force searches. These include pbkdf2, bcrypt, scrypt, argon2, and balloon.

== See also ==
- Comparison of cryptographic hash functions
- Cryptographic hash function
- Collision attack
- Preimage attack
- Length extension attack
- Cipher security summary
