= Hans Dobbertin =

German cryptographer (1952 - 2006)

- Born: 17 April 1952; Herkensen, West Germany
- Died: 2 February 2006 (aged 53); Bochum, Germany
- Education: University of Hannover
- Scientific career
- Fields: Cryptography
- Workplaces: Ruhr University
- Doctoral advisor: Marcel Erné

Hans Dobbertin (17 April, 1952 – 2 February, 2006) was a German cryptographer who is best known for his work on cryptanalysis of the MD4, MD5, and original RIPEMD hash functions, and for his part in the design of the new version of the RIPEMD hash function. He was a member of the German Federal Office for Information Security (Bundesamt für Sicherheit in der Informationstechnik, BSI) and professor at the Ruhr University in Bochum.

== Life ==
Born in Herkensen in the north of Germany, Dobbertin was the son of Hans Dobbertin and Anneliese Kamp. His father was a teacher. He attended Eldagsen primary school from 1959, the Tellkampf School in Hanover from 1963 to 1969 and a modern language high school from 1969 to 1973.

Dobbertin studied mathematics and received his doctorate in 1983 with his thesis on refinement monoids, Vaught monoids and Boolean algebras at the mathematics department at the University of Hanover. He completed his habilitation in Hanover in 1986 and moved to the Federal Office for Information Security (BSI), the German federal agency of IT security, as an associate professor. In the following decade, at BSI, Dobbertin was involved in the analysis of hash functions and developed new methods to break hash algorithms of the MD4 family. He showed that the successor MD5, which was considered safe, also contains vulnerabilities. In 2004, this result was confirmed by Chinese researchers.

After a short stay at the University of Klagenfurt, Hans Dobbertin was appointed chair of cryptology and information security at the Ruhr University Bochum in 2001. In 2003, he opened the Horst Görtz Institute for IT Security (HGI) at the Ruhr University as founding director.

== Death ==
Dobbertin died as a result of cancer on 2 February, 2006.
