= MD4 =

Cryptographic hash function

General
- Designers: Ronald Rivest
- First published: October 1990
- Series: MD2, MD4, MD5, MD6

Cipher detail
- Digest sizes: 128 bits
- Block sizes: 512 bits
- Rounds: 3

Best public cryptanalysis
- A collision attack published in 2007 can find collisions for full MD4 in less than two hash operations.

The MD4 Message-Digest Algorithm is a cryptographic hash function developed by Ronald Rivest in 1990. The digest length is 128 bits. The algorithm has influenced later designs, such as the MD5, SHA-1 and RIPEMD algorithms. The initialism "MD" stands for "Message Digest".

One MD4 operation. MD4 consists of 48 of these operations, grouped in three rounds of 16 operations. F is a nonlinear function; one function is used in each round. M_{i} denotes a 32-bit block of the message input, and K_{i} denotes a 32-bit constant, different for each round.

The security of MD4 has been severely compromised. The first full collision attack against MD4 was published in 1995, and several newer attacks have been published since then. As of 2007, an attack can generate collisions in less than two MD4 hash operations. A theoretical preimage attack also exists.

A variant of MD4 is used in the ed2k URI scheme to provide a unique identifier for a file in the popular eDonkey2000 / eMule P2P networks. MD4 was also used by the rsync protocol (prior to version 3.0.0).

MD4 is used to compute NTLM password-derived key digests on Microsoft Windows NT, XP, Vista, 7, 8, 10 and 11.

== Security ==
Weaknesses in MD4 were demonstrated by Den Boer and Bosselaers in a paper published in 1991. The first full-round MD4 collision attack was found by Hans Dobbertin in 1995, which took only seconds to carry out at that time. In August 2004, Wang et al. found a very efficient collision attack, alongside attacks on later hash function designs in the MD4/MD5/SHA-1/RIPEMD family. This result was improved later by Sasaki et al., and generating a collision is now as cheap as verifying it (a few microseconds).

In 2008, the preimage resistance of MD4 was also broken by Gaëtan Leurent, with a 2^{102} attack. In 2010 Guo et al. published a 2^{99.7} attack.

In 2011, RFC 6150 stated that RFC 1320 (MD4) is historic (obsolete).

== MD4 hashes ==
The 128-bit (16-byte) MD4 hashes (also termed message digests) are typically represented as 32-digit hexadecimal numbers. The following demonstrates a 43-byte ASCII input and the corresponding MD4 hash:

MD4("The quick brown fox jumps over the lazy dog")
= 1bee69a46ba811185c194762abaeae90

Even a small change in the message will (with overwhelming probability) result in a completely different hash, e.g. changing d to c:

MD4("The quick brown fox jumps over the lazy cog")
= b86e130ce7028da59e672d56ad0113df

The hash of the zero-length string is:

MD4("") = 31d6cfe0d16ae931b73c59d7e0c089c0

== MD4 test vectors ==
The following test vectors are defined in RFC 1320 (The MD4 Message-Digest Algorithm)

MD4 ("") = 31d6cfe0d16ae931b73c59d7e0c089c0
MD4 ("a") = bde52cb31de33e46245e05fbdbd6fb24
MD4 ("abc") = a448017aaf21d8525fc10ae87aa6729d
MD4 ("message digest") = d9130a8164549fe818874806e1c7014b
MD4 ("abcdefghijklmnopqrstuvwxyz") = d79e1c308aa5bbcdeea8ed63df412da9
MD4 ("ABCDEFGHIJKLMNOPQRSTUVWXYZabcdefghijklmnopqrstuvwxyz0123456789") = 043f8582f241db351ce627e153e7f0e4
MD4 ("12345678901234567890123456789012345678901234567890123456789012345678901234567890") = e33b4ddc9c38f2199c3e7b164fcc0536

== MD4 collision example ==
Let:

 k1 = 839c7a4d7a92cb5678a5d5b9eea5a7573c8a74deb366c3dc20a083b69f5d2a3bb3719dc69891e9f95e809fd7e8b23ba6318edd45e51fe39708bf9427e9c3e8b9
 k2 = 839c7a4d7a92cbd678a5d529eea5a7573c8a74deb366c3dc20a083b69f5d2a3bb3719dc69891e9f95e809fd7e8b23ba6318edc45e51fe39708bf9427e9c3e8b9

MD4(k1) = MD4(k2) = 4d7e6a1defa93d2dde05b45d864c429b

Note that two hex-digits of k1 and k2 define one byte of the input string, whose length is 64 bytes .

== See also ==
- Hash function security summary
- Comparison of cryptographic hash functions
- MD2
- MD5
- MD6
