= Puzzle friendliness =

Property of cryptographic hash functions

In cryptography, puzzle friendliness is a property of some cryptographic hash functions. SHA-256 is a cryptographic hash function that is thought to have this property. Informally, a hash function is puzzle friendly if no solution exists which is better than just making random guesses, and the only way to find a solution is the brute force method. Although the property is very general, it is of particular importance to proof-of-work, such as in Bitcoin mining.

== Definition ==
A hash function H is said to be puzzle friendly if for every possible n-bit output value y, if k is chosen with a distribution with high min-entropy, then it is infeasible to find x such that H(k || x) = y (where the symbol "||" denotes concatenation) in time significantly less than 2^{n}.

In the above definition, the distribution has high min-entropy means that the distribution from which k is chosen is hugely distributed so that choosing some particular random value from the distribution has only a negligible probability.

=== Why this property is called puzzle friendliness ===
Let H be a cryptographic hash function and let an output y be given. Let it be required to find z such that H(z) = y. Let us also assume that a part of the string z, say k, is known. Then, the problem of determining z boils down to finding x that should be concatenated with k to get z. The problem of determining x can be thought of a puzzle. It is really a puzzle only if the task of finding x is nontrivial and is nearly infeasible. Thus the puzzle friendliness property of a cryptographic hash function makes the problem of finding x closer to being a real puzzle.

== Application in cryptocurrency ==
The puzzle friendliness property of cryptographic hash functions is used in Bitcoin mining.

== See also ==
- Collision resistance
- Collision attack
- Preimage attack
