= Secure Hash Algorithms =

Family of cryptographic hash functions

The Secure Hash Algorithms are a family of cryptographic hash functions published by the National Institute of Standards and Technology (NIST) as a U.S. Federal Information Processing Standard (FIPS), including:

- SHA-0: A retronym applied to the original version of the 160-bit hash function published in 1993 under the name "SHA". It was withdrawn shortly after publication due to an undisclosed "significant flaw" and replaced by the slightly revised version SHA-1.
- SHA-1: A 160-bit hash function which resembles the earlier MD5 algorithm. This was designed by the National Security Agency (NSA) to be part of the Digital Signature Algorithm. Cryptographic weaknesses were discovered in SHA-1, and the standard was no longer approved for most cryptographic uses after 2010.
- SHA-2: A family of two similar hash functions, with different block sizes, known as SHA-256 and SHA-512. They differ in the word size; SHA-256 uses 32-bit words where SHA-512 uses 64-bit words. There are also truncated versions of each standard, known as SHA-224, SHA-384, SHA-512/224 and SHA-512/256. These were also designed by the NSA.
- SHA-3: A hash function formerly called Keccak, chosen in 2012 after a public competition among non-NSA designers. It supports the same hash lengths as SHA-2, and its internal structure differs significantly from the rest of the SHA family.

The corresponding standards are FIPS PUB 180 (original SHA), FIPS PUB 180-1 (SHA-1), FIPS PUB 180-2 (SHA-1, SHA-256, SHA-384, and SHA-512). NIST has updated Draft FIPS Publication 202, SHA-3 Standard separate from the Secure Hash Standard (SHS).

== Comparison of SHA functions ==
In the table below, internal state means the "internal hash sum" after each compression of a data block.

Comparison of SHA functions
Algorithm and variant		Output size (bits)	Internal state size (bits)	Block size (bits)	Rounds	Operations	Security (bits)	Performance on Skylake (median cpb)		First published
Algorithm and variant		Output size (bits)	Internal state size (bits)	Block size (bits)	Rounds	Operations	Security (bits)	Long messages	8 bytes	First published
MD5 (as reference)		128	128 (4 × 32)	512	4 (16 operations in each round)	And, Xor, Or, Rot, Add (mod 2^{32})	≤ 18 (collisions found)	4.99	55.00	1992
SHA-0		160	160 (5 × 32)	512	80	And, Xor, Or, Rot, Add (mod 2^{32})	< 34 (collisions found)	≈ SHA-1	≈ SHA-1	1993
SHA-1		160	160 (5 × 32)	512	80	And, Xor, Or, Rot, Add (mod 2^{32})	< 63 (collisions found)	3.47	52.00	1995
SHA-2	SHA-224; SHA-256	224; 256	256 (8 × 32)	512	64	And, Xor, Or, Rot, Shr, Add (mod 2^{32})	112; 128	7.62; 7.63	84.50; 85.25	2004; 2001
SHA-2	SHA-384	384	512 (8 × 64)	1024	80	And, Xor, Or, Rot, Shr, Add (mod 2^{64})	192	5.12	135.75	2001
SHA-2	SHA-512	512	512 (8 × 64)	1024	80	And, Xor, Or, Rot, Shr, Add (mod 2^{64})	256	5.06	135.50	2001
SHA-2	SHA-512/224; SHA-512/256	224; 256	512 (8 × 64)	1024	80	And, Xor, Or, Rot, Shr, Add (mod 2^{64})	112; 128	≈ SHA-384	≈ SHA-384	2012
SHA-3	SHA3-224; SHA3-256; SHA3-384; SHA3-512	224; 256; 384; 512	1600 (5 × 5 × 64)	1152; 1088; 832; 576	24	And, Xor, Rot, Not	112; 128; 192; 256	8.12; 8.59; 11.06; 15.88	154.25; 155.50; 164.00; 164.00	2015
SHA-3	SHAKE128; SHAKE256	d (arbitrary) d (arbitrary)	1600 (5 × 5 × 64)	1344; 1088	24	And, Xor, Rot, Not	min(d/2, 128) min(d/2, 256)	7.08; 8.59	155.25; 155.50	2015

== Validation ==
All SHA-family algorithms, as FIPS-approved security functions, are subject to official validation by the CMVP (Cryptographic Module Validation Program), a joint program run by the American National Institute of Standards and Technology (NIST) and the Canadian Communications Security Establishment (CSE).
