= Full Domain Hash =

Cryptographic signature scheme

In cryptography, the Full Domain Hash (FDH) is an RSA-based signature scheme that follows the hash-and-sign paradigm. It is provably secure (i.e., is existentially unforgeable under adaptive chosen-message attacks) in the random oracle model. FDH involves hashing a message using a function whose image size equals the size of the RSA modulus, and then raising the result to the secret RSA exponent.

== Security ==
In the random oracle model, if RSA is $(t', \epsilon')$-secure, then the full domain hash RSA signature scheme is $(t, \epsilon)$-secure where,

$$\begin{align}
t &= t' - (q_\text{hash} + q_\text{sig} + 1) \cdot \mathcal{O}\left(k^3\right) \\
\epsilon &= \left(1 + \frac{1}{q_\text{sig}}\right)^{q_\text{sig} + 1} \cdot q_\text{sig} \cdot \epsilon'
\end{align}$$.

For large $q_\text{sig}$ this reduces to $\epsilon \sim \exp(1)\cdot q_\text{sig} \cdot \epsilon'$.

This means that if there exists an algorithm that can forge a new FDH signature that runs in time t, computes at most $q_\text{hash}$ hashes, asks for at most $q_\text{sig}$ signatures and succeeds with probability $\epsilon$, then there must also exist an algorithm that breaks RSA with probability $\epsilon'$ in time $t'$.
