= Preimage attack =

Attack model against cryptographic hash functions

In cryptography, a preimage attack on cryptographic hash functions tries to find a message that has a specific hash value. A cryptographic hash function should resist attacks on its preimage (set of possible inputs).

In the context of attack, there are two types of preimage resistance:

- preimage resistance: for essentially all pre-specified outputs, it is computationally infeasible to find any input that hashes to that output; i.e., given y, it is difficult to find an x such that h(x) = y.
- second-preimage resistance: for a specified input, it is computationally infeasible to find another input which produces the same output; i.e., given x, it is difficult to find a second input x′ ≠ x such that h(x) = h(x′).

These can be compared with a collision resistance, in which it is computationally infeasible to find any two distinct inputs x, x′ that hash to the same output; i.e., such that h(x) = h(x′).

Collision resistance implies second-preimage resistance, but does not guarantee preimage resistance. However, under certain assumptions of the range of the hash function, collision resistance does imply preimage resistance (by a provisional implication). Conversely, a second-preimage attack implies a collision attack (trivially, since, in addition to x′, x is already known right from the start). Via the provisional implication, a preimage attack will also imply a second-preimage attack, which then also extends to a collision attack.

== Applied preimage attacks ==
By definition, an ideal hash function is such that the fastest way to compute a first or second preimage is through a brute-force attack. For an n-bit hash, this attack has a time complexity 2^{n}, which is considered too high for a typical output size of n = 128 bits. If such complexity is the best that can be achieved by an adversary, then the hash function is considered preimage-resistant. However, there is a general result that quantum computers perform a structured preimage attack in $\sqrt{2^{n}} = 2^{\frac{n}{2}}$, which also implies second preimage and thus a collision attack.

Faster preimage attacks can be found by cryptanalysing certain hash functions, and are specific to that function. Some significant preimage attacks have already been discovered, but they are not yet practical. If a practical preimage attack is discovered, it would drastically affect many Internet protocols. In this case, "practical" means that it could be executed by an attacker with a reasonable amount of resources. For example, a preimaging attack that costs trillions of dollars and takes decades to preimage one desired hash value or one message is not practical; one that costs a few thousand dollars and takes a few weeks might be very practical.

All currently known practical or almost-practical attacks on MD5 and SHA-1 are collision attacks. In general, a collision attack is easier to mount than a preimage attack, as it is not restricted by any set value (any two values can be used to collide). The time complexity of a brute-force collision attack, in contrast to the preimage attack, is only $2^{\frac{n}{2}}$.

=== Restricted preimage space attacks ===
The computational infeasibility of a first preimage attack on an ideal hash function assumes that the set of possible hash inputs is too large for a brute force search. However if a given hash value is known to have been produced from a set of inputs that is relatively small or is ordered by likelihood in some way, then a brute force search may be effective. Practicality depends on the input set size and the speed or cost of computing the hash function.

A common example is the use of hashes to store password validation data for authentication. Rather than store the plaintext of user passwords, an access control system stores a hash of the password. When a user requests access, the password they submit is hashed and compared with the stored value. If the stored validation data is stolen, the thief will only have the hash values, not the passwords. However most users choose passwords in predictable ways and many passwords are short enough that all possible combinations can be tested if fast hashes are used, even if the hash is rated secure against preimage attacks. Special hashes called key derivation functions have been created to slow searches. See Password cracking. For a method to prevent the testing of short passwords see salt (cryptography).

== See also ==
- Birthday attack
- Cryptographic hash function
- Hash function security summary
- Puzzle friendliness
- Rainbow table
- Random oracle
- RFC 4270: Attacks on Cryptographic Hashes in Internet Protocols
