= MurmurHash =

Computer function

MurmurHash is a non-cryptographic hash function suitable for general hash-based lookup. It was created by Austin Appleby in 2008 and, as of 8 January 2016, is hosted on GitHub along with its test suite named SMHasher. It also exists in a number of variants, all of which have been released into the public domain. The name comes from two basic operations, multiply (MU) and rotate (R), used in its inner loop.

Unlike cryptographic hash functions, it is not specifically designed to be difficult to reverse by an adversary, making it unsuitable for cryptographic purposes.

== Variants ==
=== MurmurHash1 ===
The original MurmurHash was created as an attempt to make a faster function than Lookup3. Although successful, it had not been tested thoroughly and was not capable of providing 64-bit hashes as in Lookup3. Its design would be later built upon in MurmurHash2, combining a multiplicative hash (similar to the Fowler–Noll–Vo hash function) with an Xorshift.

=== MurmurHash2 ===
MurmurHash2 yields a 32- or 64-bit value. It comes in multiple variants, including some that allow incremental hashing and aligned or neutral versions.

- MurmurHash2 (32-bit, x86)—The original version; contains a flaw that weakens collision in some cases.
- MurmurHash2A (32-bit, x86)—A fixed variant using Merkle–Damgård construction. Slightly slower.
- CMurmurHash2A (32-bit, x86)—MurmurHash2A, but works incrementally.
- MurmurHashNeutral2 (32-bit, x86)—Slower, but endian- and alignment-neutral.
- MurmurHashAligned2 (32-bit, x86)—Slower, but does aligned reads (safer on some platforms).
- MurmurHash64A (64-bit, x64)—The original 64-bit version. Optimized for 64-bit arithmetic.
- MurmurHash64B (64-bit, x86)—A 64-bit version optimized for 32-bit platforms. It is not a true 64-bit hash due to insufficient mixing of the stripes.

The person who originally found the flaw in MurmurHash2 created an unofficial 160-bit version of MurmurHash2 called MurmurHash2_160.

=== MurmurHash3 ===
The current version, completed April 3, 2011, is MurmurHash3, which yields a 32-bit or 128-bit hash value. When using 128-bits, the x86 and x64 versions do not produce the same values, as the algorithms are optimized for their respective platforms. MurmurHash3 was released alongside SMHasher, a hash function test suite.

== Implementations ==
The canonical implementation is in C++, but there are efficient ports for a variety of popular languages, including Python, C, Go, C#, D, Lua, Perl, Ruby, Rust, PHP, Common Lisp, Haskell, Elm, Clojure, Scala, Java, Erlang, Swift, Object Pascal, Kotlin, JavaScript, OCaml and Microsoft Excel.

It has been adopted into a number of open-source projects, most notably libstdc++ (ver 4.6), nginx (ver 1.0.1), Rubinius, libmemcached (the C driver for Memcached), npm (nodejs package manager), maatkit, Hadoop, Kyoto Cabinet, Cassandra, Solr, vowpal wabbit, Elasticsearch, Guava, Kafka, and RedHat Virtual Data Optimizer (VDO).

== Vulnerabilities ==
Hash functions can be vulnerable to collision attacks, where a user can choose input data in such a way so as to intentionally cause hash collisions. Jean-Philippe Aumasson and Daniel J. Bernstein were able to show that even implementations of MurmurHash using a randomized seed are vulnerable to so-called HashDoS attacks. With the use of differential cryptanalysis, they were able to generate inputs that would lead to a hash collision. The authors of the attack recommend using their own SipHash instead.

== Algorithm ==
algorithm Murmur3_32 is
    // Note: In this version, all arithmetic is performed with unsigned 32-bit integers.
    //       In the case of overflow, the result is reduced modulo 232.
    input: key, len, seed

    c1 ← 0xcc9e2d51
    c2 ← 0x1b873593
    r1 ← 15
    r2 ← 13
    m ← 5
    n ← 0xe6546b64

    hash ← seed

    for each fourByteChunk of key do
        k ← fourByteChunk

        k ← k × c1
        k ← k ROL r1
        k ← k × c2

        hash ← hash XOR k
        hash ← hash ROL r2
        hash ← (hash × m) + n

    with any remainingBytesInKey do
        remainingBytes ← SwapToLittleEndian(remainingBytesInKey)
        // Note: Endian swapping is only necessary on big-endian machines.
        //       The purpose is to place the meaningful digits towards the low end of the value,
        //       so that these digits have the greatest potential to affect the low range digits
        //       in the subsequent multiplication.  Consider that locating the meaningful digits
        //       in the high range would produce a greater effect upon the high digits of the
        //       multiplication, and notably, that such high digits are likely to be discarded
        //       by the modulo arithmetic under overflow.  We don't want that.

        remainingBytes ← remainingBytes × c1
        remainingBytes ← remainingBytes ROL r1
        remainingBytes ← remainingBytes × c2

        hash ← hash XOR remainingBytes

    hash ← hash XOR len

    hash ← hash XOR (hash >> 16)
    hash ← hash × 0x85ebca6b
    hash ← hash XOR (hash >> 13)
    hash ← hash × 0xc2b2ae35
    hash ← hash XOR (hash >> 16)

A sample C implementation follows (for little-endian CPUs):

static inline uint32_t murmur_32_scramble(uint32_t k) {
    k *= 0xcc9e2d51;
    k = (k << 15) | (k >> 17);
    k *= 0x1b873593;
    return k;
}
uint32_t murmur3_32(const uint8_t* key, size_t len, uint32_t seed)
{
	uint32_t h = seed;
    uint32_t k;
    /* Read in groups of 4. */
    for (size_t i = len >> 2; i; i--) {
        // Here is a source of differing results across endiannesses.
        // A swap here has no effects on hash properties though.
        memcpy(&k, key, sizeof(uint32_t));
        key += sizeof(uint32_t);
        h ^= murmur_32_scramble(k);
        h = (h << 13) | (h >> 19);
        h = h * 5 + 0xe6546b64;
    }
    /* Read the rest. */
    k = 0;
    for (size_t i = len & 3; i; i--) {
        k <<= 8;
        k |= key[i - 1];
    }
    // A swap is *not* necessary here because the preceding loop already
    // places the low bytes in the low places according to whatever endianness
    // we use. Swaps only apply when the memory is copied in a chunk.
    h ^= murmur_32_scramble(k);
    /* Finalize. */
	h ^= len;
	h ^= h >> 16;
	h *= 0x85ebca6b;
	h ^= h >> 13;
	h *= 0xc2b2ae35;
	h ^= h >> 16;
	return h;
}

Tests
Test string	Seed value	Hash value (hexadecimal)	Hash value (decimal)
	0x00000000	0x00000000	0
	0x00000001	0x514E28B7	1,364,076,727
	0xffffffff	0x81F16F39	2,180,083,513
test	0x00000000	0xba6bd213	3,127,628,307
test	0x9747b28c	0x704b81dc	1,883,996,636
Hello, world!	0x00000000	0xc0363e43	3,224,780,355
Hello, world!	0x9747b28c	0x24884CBA	612,912,314
The quick brown fox jumps over the lazy dog	0x00000000	0x2e4ff723	776,992,547
The quick brown fox jumps over the lazy dog	0x9747b28c	0x2FA826CD	799,549,133

== See also ==
- Non-cryptographic hash functions
