= FNV =

FNV may refer to:

- Federation of Dutch Trade Unions (Dutch: Federatie Nederlandse Vakbeweging), a national trade union centre in the Netherlands
- Fowler–Noll–Vo hash function, a non-cryptographic hash function
- Franco-Nevada (stock stickers: FNV), a Canadian gold-focused royalty and streaming company
- Furness Vale railway station (station code: FNV), on the Stockport, Disley and Whaley Bridge line in Derbyshire, England
