= Robert Uzgalis =

American computer scientist (1940–2012)

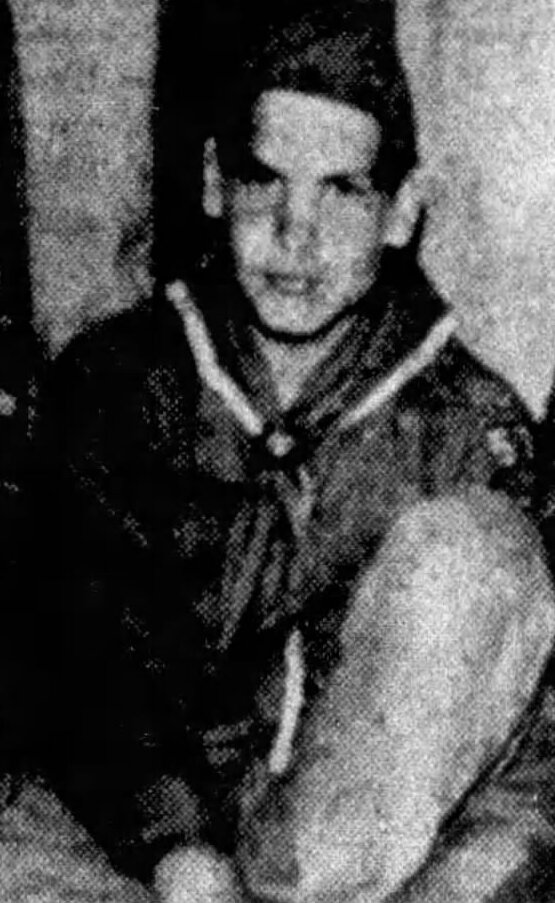
Uzgalis as a Boy Scout in 1954

Robert Charles Uzgalis (juːˈɡælɪs, September 29, 1940 – March 19, 2012) was an American computer scientist and professor at the University of California, Los Angeles (UCLA). He is known for his work with Thelma Estrin on the computerized display of electroencephalography (EEG) and for his interest in the ALGOL 68 programming language. He was co-author of the book Grammars for Programming Languages (1977) and later left the United States to consult in Japan and lecture at the University of Hong Kong and the University of Auckland. He created the eponymously named BuzHash, and in his retirement, he established the Tigertail Virtual Museum art history project.

== Early life ==
Uzgalis was born in Chicago, Illinois, United States, on September 29, 1940. His mother was Harriet (née Jones), who was originally from Scotland, and his father was Charles John Uzgalis, an American with Lithuanian heritage. At the age of 10, his family moved to Los Angeles, California. He was raised in Santa Monica, Palms, and Lawndale, where he graduated from Leuzinger High School and was active with the chess club.

== Academic career ==
Uzgalis began working at UCLA in 1964 as a computer programmer in the sociology and anatomy departments. He started lecturing in the computer science department at that same time, becoming a professor from 1973 to 1985. In the late 1960s, he collaborated with Thelma Estrin and worked with her as a programmer on the computerized display of EEG patterns. Researcher and historian Autumn Stanley notes that Uzgalis helped Estrin animate the EEG as a spatio-temporal pattern by creating EEG movies, leading to "new clinical insights". Around that time, in October 1969, UCLA became the first node on the ARPANET, the first operational packet-switched network and precursor to the modern internet. The ARPANET directory lists Uzgalis as active on the network in the mid-1970s. Uzgalis, who was known to his friends as "Buz" (Bob Uzgalis), began using "buz" in the ARPANET directory.

Uzgalis became active with the ALGOL 68 programming language in the early 1970s, participating in its revision and support committees. In 1977, Uzgalis co-authored a computer science book about van Wijngaarden grammar with J. Craig Cleaveland titled Grammars for Programming Languages. The book, which introduced the term "W-grammar", was positively reviewed by Dick Grune and Ceriel J. H. Jacobs. The June 1982 undergraduate course catalog for UCLA lists Uzgalis with the title of "Assistant Professor of Engineering and Applied Science" in the Computer Science department. During his career at UCLA, Uzgalis taught twelve separate courses, from engineering courses in information processing systems to advanced topics in computer graphics.

After leaving UCLA, Uzgalis moved overseas, living in Osaka, Hong Kong, and Auckland. While in Japan, he did research and consulting work with the Sumitomo Corporation and AIR Co. Ltd. He was a visiting lecturer at the University of Hong Kong from 1990 to 1993, teaching computer concepts and programming languages.

While working in Hong Kong, Uzgalis became interested in the problem of general hash functions after reading about Pearson hashing, a non-cryptographic hash function made popular by Peter K. Pearson in his paper "Fast Hashing of Variable-Length Text Strings" (1990). Another paper, "Selecting a hashing algorithm" (1990) by Bruce J. McKenzie, led Uzgalis to create his own hash function in 1992, which he called the BuzHash. The BuzHash replaces each character (or byte) in the input with a randomized 32-bit alias from a substitution table designed so that each bit changes half the time, creating an even hash. Estébanez et al. (2014) describe the BuzHash as one of the most important in its class.

From 1993 to 1996, Uzgalis was a senior lecturer at the University of Auckland, where he taught software engineering, computer graphics, and programming. He was also a senior lecturer at the University College London, Hong Kong External Course, where he taught a course on human–computer interaction.

== Later life ==
Uzgalis consulted for the Getty Trust in Santa Monica from 1987 to 1990. Upon his retirement in 1997, Uzgalis returned to his interest in art history and in the digital restoration of paintings. To host this work, he created the Tigertail Virtual Museum educational project. In late 2001, Matthew Mirapaul of The New York Times reported that the Tigertail Museum hosted 5000 digital works of art online. Uzgalis focused on restoring and freshening up artworks to make them look like they did when they were first produced. His changes included brightening dull paintings that had lost their color over time and repairing broken sculptures so they appeared intact again. Uzgalis described some of his restorations as "outrageous", such as editing the Leaning Tower of Pisa to stand straight.

Uzgalis died at Ronald Reagan UCLA Medical Center in 2012.

== Legacy ==
Uzgalis was self-taught, and did not have formal training in computer science. In their remembrance of him after his death, the UCLA Computer Science Department said he was an "inspiration to his colleagues and students".

== Selected publications ==
- Estrin T. A.; Uzgalis R. C. (1969). "Computerized display of spatiotemporal EEG patterns". IEEE Transactions on Biomedical Engineering. vol. BME-16: 192–196.
- Uzgalis, Robert C. (1970). "A Short History of Computer System Modeling and Measurements at the University of California, Los Angeles". In: Händler, W., Spies, P.P. (eds) Rechnerstrukturen und Betriebsprogrammierung. ARCS 1970. Lecture Notes in Computer Science, vol 13. Springer, Berlin, Heidelberg. (subscription required)
- Estrin, Gerald; Muntz, Richard R.; Uzgalis, Robert C. (1972). "Modeling, measurement and computer power". AFIPS Spring Joint Computing Conference 1972: 725–738.
- Cleaveland, J. Craig; Uzgalis, Robert C. (1977). Grammars for Programming Languages. Elsevier. ISBN 9780444001993. OCLC 2347110.
- Estrin, Thelma; Uzgalis, Robert C. (Nov. 1979). "Information Systems for Patient Care". Computer. 12 (11): 4–7. (subscription required)
- Cheung, B.S.N.; Uzgalis, R.C. (1994). "Evaluating Language Acquisition Models – A Common Framework". In Yfantis, E. A. (ed.). Intelligent Systems. (1995). Third Golden West International Conference. Dordrecht: Kluwer Academic. pp. 135–141. ISBN 9780792334224. OCLC 32090764.
