= Marvcus Patton =

American football player (born 1967)

No. 53
- Position: Linebacker

Personal information
- Born: May 1, 1967 (age 59); Los Angeles, California, U.S.
- Listed height: 6 ft 2 in (1.88 m)
- Listed weight: 241 lb (109 kg)

Career information
- High school: Leuzinger (Lawndale, California)
- College: UCLA
- NFL draft: 1990: 8th round, 208th overall pick

Career history
- Buffalo Bills (1990–1994); Washington Redskins (1995–1998); Kansas City Chiefs (1999–2002)

Awards and highlights
- Second-team All-Pac-10 (1989)

Career NFL statistics
- Sacks: 27.5
- Interceptions: 17
- Forced fumbles: 12
- Stats at Pro Football Reference

Marvcus Raymond Patton (born May 1, 1967) is an American former professional football player who was a linebacker for 13 seasons in the National Football League (NFL). He played college football for the UCLA Bruins and was selected by the Buffalo Bills in the eighth round of the 1990 NFL draft. Patton played in the NFL from 1990 to 2002 for the Bills, Washington Redskins, and Kansas City Chiefs. He never missed a regular season game in his entire career. After earning a full-time starting role in his fourth season with the Bills, he started all but three games for the remainder of his career.

== Early life ==
Patton was just 9-years-old when his father Raymond Hicks, an undercover detective in Los Angeles, was shot and killed in the line of duty. His mother, Barbara Patton, a former National Women's Football League player with the Los Angeles Dandelions, taught Patton about football. Mother and son both played middle linebacker, with Barbara once breaking an opposing player's helmet. “I thought it was really cool to tell my friends that my mom was a linebacker,” Patton once shared.

== Football career ==
Earning an academic scholarship, Patton was a walk-on at the University of California, Los Angeles (UCLA).

As a rookie in 1990, Patton was injured on the opening kickoff in the Bills 1990 playoff opener against the Miami Dolphins with a lower leg injury. He did not play in either of the Bills final two playoff games, but went on to play in every regular season game for the rest of his career.

== Personal life ==
Currently, Patton resides in the Washington D.C. area with his wife, Dr. Ina Patton, their two children, and their dog, Jack. Marvcus is a restaurateur and owns sports-themed restaurants in Northern Virginia, one of which is Lucky's Sports Theatre and Grill in Springfield, Virginia. Patton and his wife also created a children's apparel and book company, Girls Like Math, that promotes positive images for girls and challenges gender stereotypes with fun, hip clothing and entertaining books and games.
