= Leuzinger High School =

Location
- 4118 West Rosecrans Ave. Lawndale, California; United States; 33°54′5″N 118°20′49″W

Information
- Type: Public
- Motto: Citius, altius, fortius
- Established: 1931
- School district: Centinela Valley Union High School District
- Principal: Dr. Mark Hill
- Staff: 81.82 (FTE)
- Enrollment: 1,924 (2023-2024)
- Student to teacher ratio: 23.52
- Colors: Blue and white
- Athletics conference: CIF Southern Section; Ocean League
- Nickname: Olympians
- Information: 310-263-2200
- Website: www.leuzinger.org

Leuzinger High School is a public high school (9th through 12th grades) in Lawndale, California, United States. It opened on January 27, 1931, with an enrollment of 268. It was named after Adolph Leuzinger in recognition of his 25 years of service on the board of trustees of the Inglewood Union High School District. The school is in the Centinela Valley Union High School District.

Leuzinger High had an enrollment of 1,924 as of the 2023-24 school year.

== Faculty and administration ==
As of the 2024-25 school year, the administration is headed by principal Dr. Mark Hill, and associate principals Erin Estrada, Tina Preciado, and Karen Kim.

For many years, Leuzinger High School was considered to be a typical inner-city school, mostly known for producing athletes such as Kei Kamara, Marvcus Patton and Russell Westbrook. However, over the past few years, it has consistently shown academic growth spurts, largely due to its faculty and administration.

== Olympic mascot ==
As Leuzinger's first senior class graduated while the 1932 Summer Olympics were hosted in and around nearby Los Angeles, the school's nickname became the "Olympians". Leuzinger was granted authorization for the school to use the Olympic name and Olympic rings trademark.

== Notable alumni ==
- Nnamdi Asomugha, All-Pro NFL cornerback, actor, producer (freshman year only)
- George Foster, class of 1967, Cincinnati Reds outfielder, two-time World Series champion and 1977 National League Most Valuable Player
- Mike Gin, mayor of Redondo Beach, California
- Ross Jeffries, author, "speed seduction" guru
- Kei Kamara, New England Revolution striker
- Kurupt attended Leuzinger in the late 1980s before dropping out.
- Marvcus Patton, linebacker for UCLA and Buffalo Bills; played in four Super Bowls
- Tiran Porter, class of 1966, The Doobie Brothers bass guitarist
- Robert Uzgalis, class of 1958, computer science professor at the University of California, Los Angeles
- Russell Westbrook, class of 2006, Sacramento Kings guard, two-time league scoring champion and 2017 NBA Most Valuable Player
- Delon Wright, Washington Wizards guard, first-round selection of 2015 NBA draft
- Dorell Wright, Lokomotiv Kuban guard-forward
- Gyasi Zardes, forward for Columbus Crew
