= Russell Westbrook =

American basketball player (born 1988)

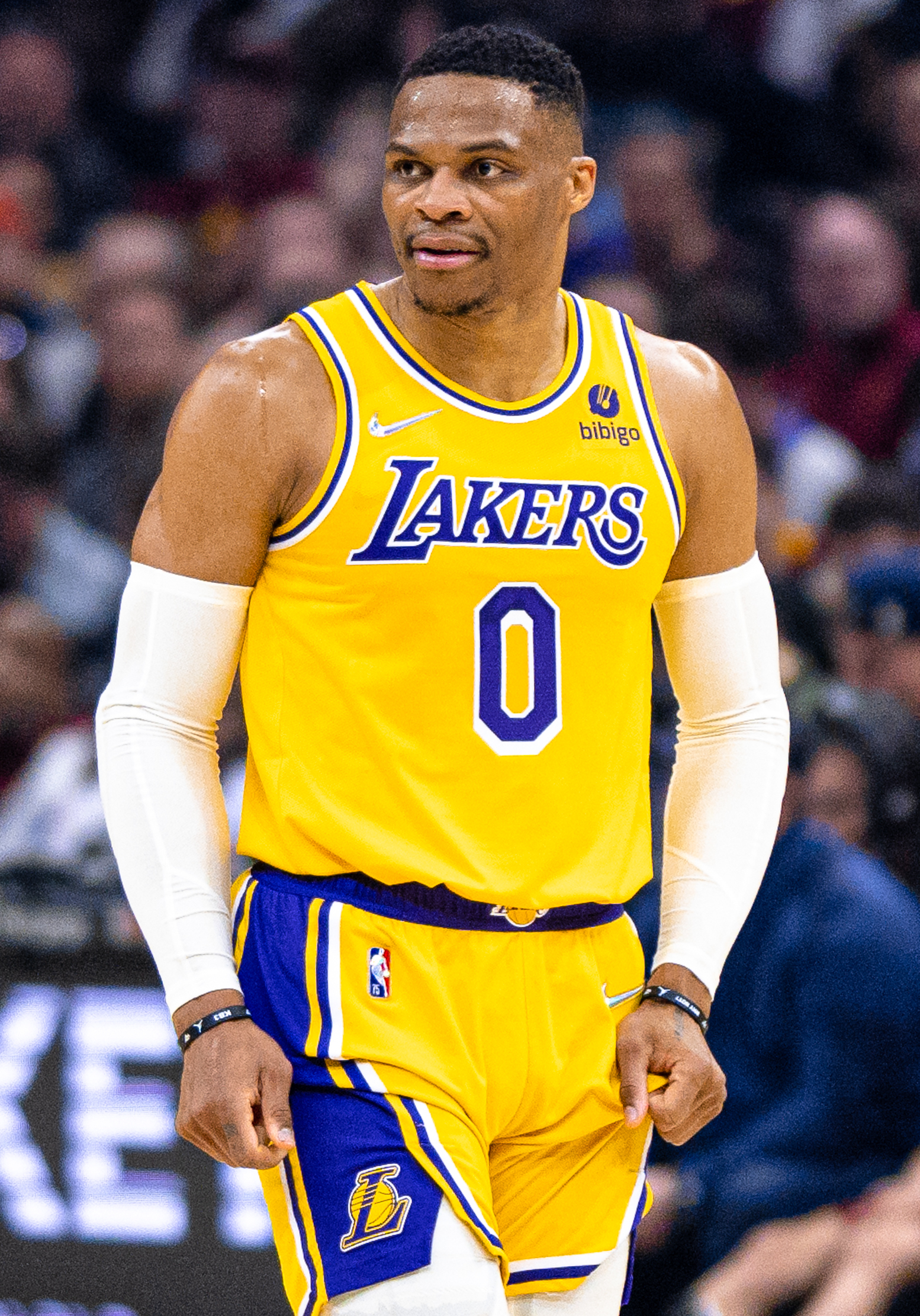
- Westbrook with the Los Angeles Lakers in 2022

Personal information
- Born: November 12, 1988 (age 38) Long Beach, California, U.S.
- Listed height: 6 ft 4 in (1.93 m)
- Listed weight: 200 lb (91 kg)

Career information
- High school: Leuzinger (Lawndale, California)
- College: UCLA (2006–2008)
- NBA draft: 2008: 1st round, 4th overall pick
- Drafted by: Seattle SuperSonics
- Playing career: 2008–2026
- Position: Point guard
- Number: 0, 4, 18

Career history
- 2008–2019: Oklahoma City Thunder
- 2019–2020: Houston Rockets
- 2020–2021: Washington Wizards
- 2021–2023: Los Angeles Lakers
- 2023–2024: Los Angeles Clippers
- 2024–2025: Denver Nuggets
- 2025–2026: Sacramento Kings

Career highlights
- NBA Most Valuable Player (2017); 9× NBA All-Star (2011–2013, 2015–2020); 2× NBA All-Star Game MVP (2015, 2016); 2× All-NBA First Team (2016, 2017); 5× All-NBA Second Team (2011–2013, 2015, 2018); 2× All-NBA Third Team (2019, 2020); 2× NBA scoring champion (2015, 2017); 3× NBA assists leader (2018, 2019, 2021); NBA All-Rookie First Team (2009); NBA 75th Anniversary Team; Third-team All-Pac-10 (2008); Pac-10 Defensive Player of the Year (2008); Pac-10 All-Defensive Team (2008)

Career statistics
- Points: 27,176 (20.9 ppg)
- Rebounds: 9,025 (6.9 rpg)
- Assists: 10,351 (8.0 apg)
- Stats at NBA.com
- Stats at Basketball Reference
Medals
Men's basketball
Representing the United States
Olympic Games
Gold medal – first place	2012 London	Team competition
World Championship/World Cup
Gold medal – first place	2010 Turkey	Team competition

Russell Westbrook III (born November 12, 1988) is an American former professional basketball player who played 18 seasons in the National Basketball Association (NBA). Known for his agility, intensity and explosiveness, he is considered one of the greatest point guards in NBA history. Westbrook is a nine-time NBA All-Star and earned the NBA Most Valuable Player Award (MVP) for the 2016–17 season. He is also a nine-time All-NBA Team member; a two-time NBA scoring leader, having led the league in 2014–15 and 2016–17; a three-time NBA assists leader; and a back-to-back NBA All-Star Game MVP. Westbrook is one of three players in NBA history to average a triple-double for a season, a feat he achieved four times and is the all-time NBA leader in career triple-doubles. He also holds the record for the most career rebounds by a guard. In 2021, Westbrook was named to the NBA 75th Anniversary Team.

Westbrook played college basketball for the UCLA Bruins and earned third-team all-conference honors in the Pac-10. He was selected with the fourth overall pick in the 2008 NBA draft by the Seattle SuperSonics, who then relocated to Oklahoma City that same week. Westbrook played for the Thunder for 11 seasons and is the franchise's all-time leading scorer. He appeared in the NBA Finals as a member of the Thunder in 2012, losing to the Miami Heat. In 2019, Westbrook was traded to the Houston Rockets, playing one season for the organization before being traded again to the Washington Wizards in 2020. After a season in Washington, he was traded to the Los Angeles Lakers in 2021. Following two relatively disappointing seasons there, he was traded to and bought out by the Utah Jazz before signing with the Los Angeles Clippers later in the 2022–23 season. In the summer of 2024, he was again traded to the Utah Jazz and waived preceding his signing with the Denver Nuggets for the 2024–25 season, followed by his signing with the Sacramento Kings for the 2025–26 season. Following the 2026 season, Westbrook retired, concluding his 18 year career.

Westbrook represented the United States national team twice, winning gold medals on their 2010 FIBA World Championship and 2012 Olympic teams.

== Early life ==
Russell Westbrook III was born in Long Beach, California, to Russell Westbrook Jr. and Shannon Horton. He has a younger brother named Raynard. Growing up in Hawthorne, Westbrook and his best friend Khelcey Barrs III had hopes of going to UCLA and playing together. At age 16, Barrs was already known to have excellent basketball skills and received college scholarship offers. In May 2004, Barrs died from an enlarged heart during a pick-up game. After Barrs' death, Westbrook seemed even more determined to excel in honor of his best friend's memory. Westbrook never fails to wear a "KB3" wristband in loving memory of his best friend.

== High school career ==
Westbrook entered Leuzinger High School as a point guard who stood only 5 ft 8 in (1.73 m) tall and weighed only 140 pounds (64 kg), although he did have large (size 14) feet. He did not start on his school's varsity team until his junior year, and did not receive his first college recruiting letter until the summer before his senior year. Westbrook attained his adult height of 6 ft 3 in (1.91 m) that same summer.

During his senior year, Westbrook averaged 25.1 points, 8.7 rebounds, 3.1 steals, and 2.3 assists and helped lead them to a 25–4 record. That same season, he recorded 14 double-doubles, scored 30 or more points on eight occasions, and registered a career-best 51 points at Carson on January 6, 2006. Westbrook initially did not attract much attention from top college basketball programs. After his height increased, contributing to him averaging more than 25 points per game and becoming a solid college basketball prospect, coach Ben Howland recruited him to play for the UCLA Bruins. Westbrook declined other offers while waiting for the Bruins' Jordan Farmar to leave early for the NBA and free up a scholarship.

College recruiting
Name	Hometown	School	Height	Weight	Commit date
Russell Westbrook; PG	Lawndale, California	Leuzinger High	6 ft 2 in (1.88 m)	175 lb (79 kg)	Apr 19, 2006
Russell Westbrook; PG	Recruit ratings: Scout: Rivals: 247Sports:				
Overall recruit ranking: Scout: 66 (national); 21 (school)
Note: In many cases, Scout, Rivals, 247Sports, On3, and ESPN may conflict in their listings of height and weight.; In these cases, the average was taken. ESPN grades are on a 100-point scale.; Sources: "2006 UCLA Basketball Commitment List". Rivals.; "2006 UCLA College Basketball Team Recruiting Prospects". Scout.; "Scout.com Team Recruiting Rankings". Scout.; "2006 Team Ranking". Rivals.

== College career ==
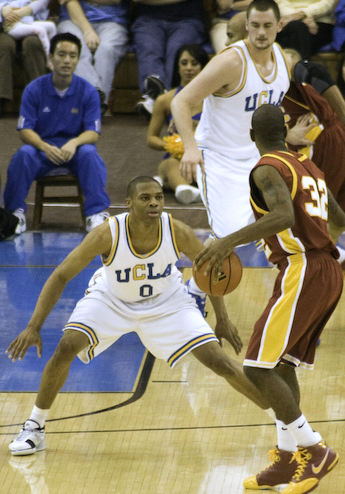
Westbrook defending USC's O. J. Mayo in 2008

Upon arriving at the University of California, Los Angeles, Westbrook's high school jersey number 4 was already taken by Arron Afflalo, so Westbrook wore number 0 throughout his time with the Bruins. As a freshman in 2006–07, he played as a backup to Darren Collison and was primarily used as a defender and energy player off the bench. Westbrook averaged 3.4 points, 0.8 rebounds, and 0.7 assists on the year. During the off-season, he trained extensively, both in the weight room and in the gym, where he faced NBA veterans who visited Los Angeles. The next season, Collison was injured and Westbrook was named the starter. He finished the season averaging 12.7 points, 3.9 rebounds, 4.7 assists and 1.6 steals. At the end of the year, he was named third-team All-Pac-10 and was voted the Pac-10 Defensive Player of the Year.

UCLA advanced to the Final Four during each of Westbrook's seasons with the team. In 2007, they lost to eventual national champion Florida, 76–66, and in 2008, they lost 78–63 to Memphis. After two years with the Bruins, Westbrook decided to forgo his final two years of eligibility and enter the 2008 NBA draft. He stayed in school and finished the quarter, a rarity for high draft picks declaring early for the draft.

== Professional career ==
=== Oklahoma City Thunder (2008–2019) ===
==== All-Rookie honors and first playoffs (2008–10) ====
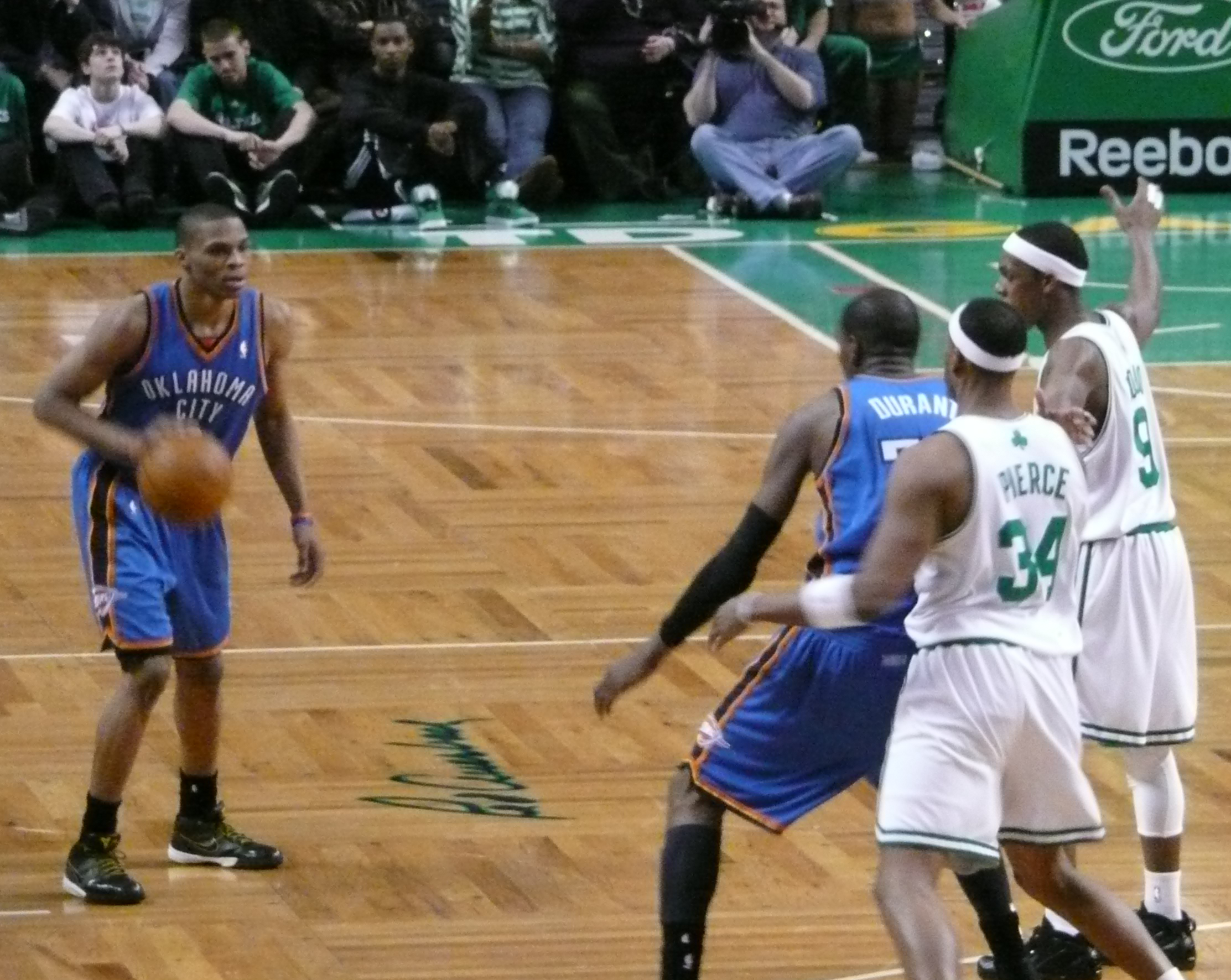
Westbrook (left) looks at then-teammate Kevin Durant in the post against Boston in March 2010

Westbrook was selected fourth overall in the 2008 NBA draft by the Seattle SuperSonics, which then relocated to Oklahoma City and became the Thunder six days later. He signed with the team on July 5, 2008. Westbrook was again unable to wear his old number 4 jersey, as Nick Collison was already wearing it, so instead he wore 0 again. He would not wear the number 4 jersey until the 2023–24 season. On March 2, 2009, Westbrook recorded his first career triple-double with 17 points, 10 rebounds and 10 assists. He was the first rookie since Chris Paul and the third rookie in Sonics/Thunder franchise history (Art Harris and Gary Payton) to record a triple-double.

Westbrook averaged 15.3 points, 5.3 assists, 4.9 rebounds, and 1.3 steals per game in his rookie season. He finished fourth in the 2008–09 NBA Rookie of the Year voting and was named to the NBA's NBA All-Rookie First Team.

In his second season, and his first season as a full-time starter, Westbrook averaged 16.1 points, 8.0 assists, 4.9 rebounds, and 1.3 steals per game. The Thunder made a huge turnaround by more than doubling their wins from the previous season and qualified for the playoffs with a 50–32 record. The Thunder were eliminated by the eventual champion Los Angeles Lakers in the first round. In the series, Westbrook stepped up his play from the regular season, averaging 20.5 points, 6.0 rebounds, 6.0 assists, and 3.2 steals.

==== First All-Star, All-NBA and NBA Finals appearances (2010–12) ====
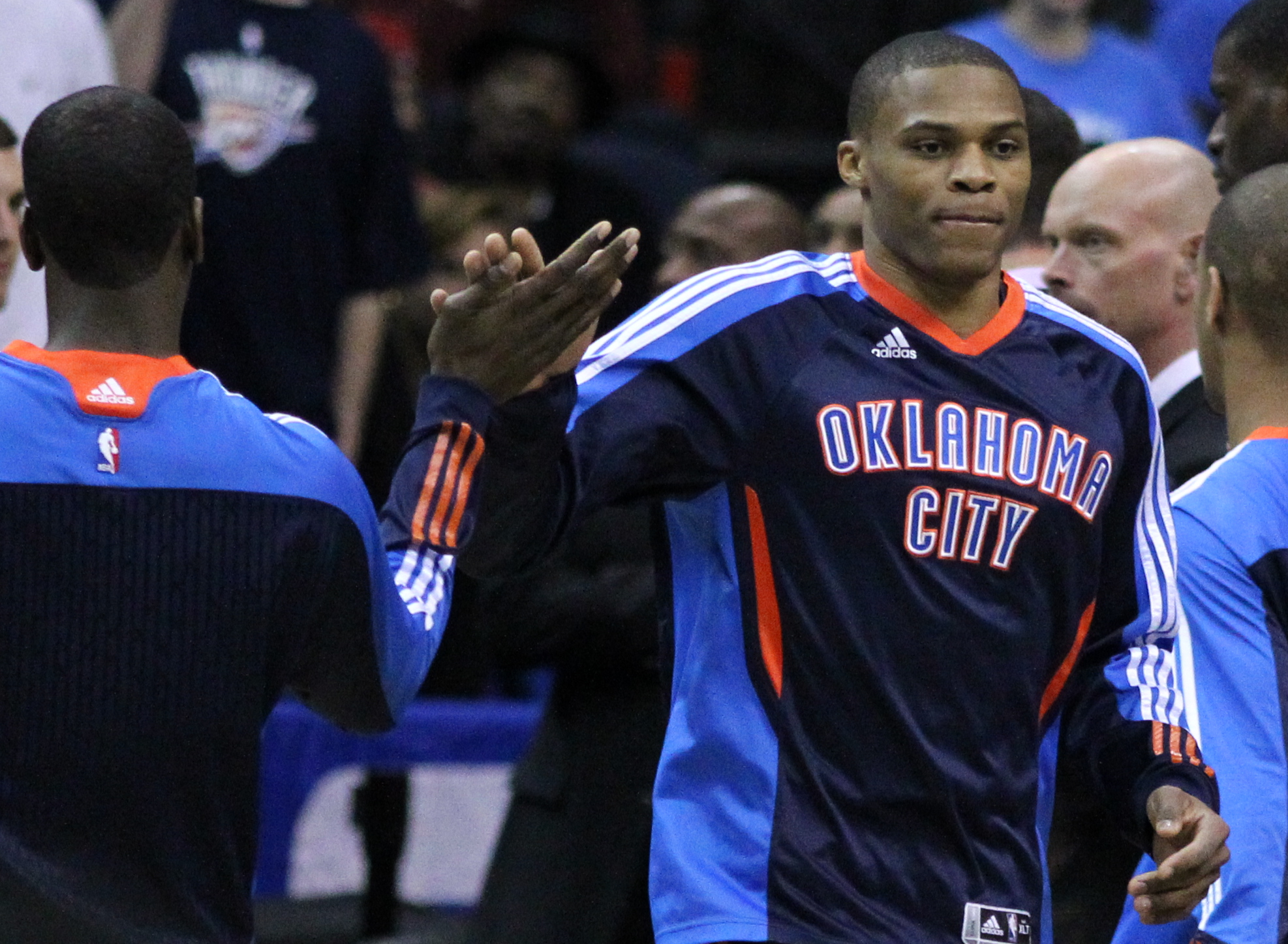
Westbrook in March 2011

On November 26, 2010, Westbrook scored a then-career-high 43 points against the Indiana Pacers. Westbrook was selected by NBA head coaches to be a Western Conference reserve for the 2011 NBA All-Star Game. This was his first all-star appearance. Westbrook finished the season with averages of 21.9 points, 8.2 assists, 4.6 rebounds, and 1.9 steals. He was named to the All-NBA Second Team for the first time. The Thunder finished the season at 55–27 and lost to the eventual world champion Dallas Mavericks in the Western Conference Finals. Westbrook averaged 23.8 points, 6.4 assists, and 5.4 rebounds in the playoffs.

Due to the lockout, the 2011–12 season would start on Christmas Day. On January 9, 2012, Westbrook would sign a 5-year, $80 million extension to keep him in Oklahoma City through the 2016–17 season. On February 9, was again selected by the coaches to participate in the 2012 NBA All-Star Game. On March 23, 2012, he scored a career-high 45 points in a 149–140 double overtime win over the Minnesota Timberwolves. He averaged 23.6 points, 5.5 assists, 4.6 rebounds and 1.7 steals for the lockout-shortened season and was voted to the All-NBA Second Team for the second year in a row.

Westbrook helped lead the Thunder to the NBA Finals for the first time since the franchise relocated, but they would lose in five games to the Miami Heat. On June 12, in Game 1 of the Finals, Westbrook recorded 27 points and 11 assists in a 105–94 victory. In a Game 4 loss, Westbrook scored a playoff career-high 43 points.

==== Season-ending injury (2012–13) ====
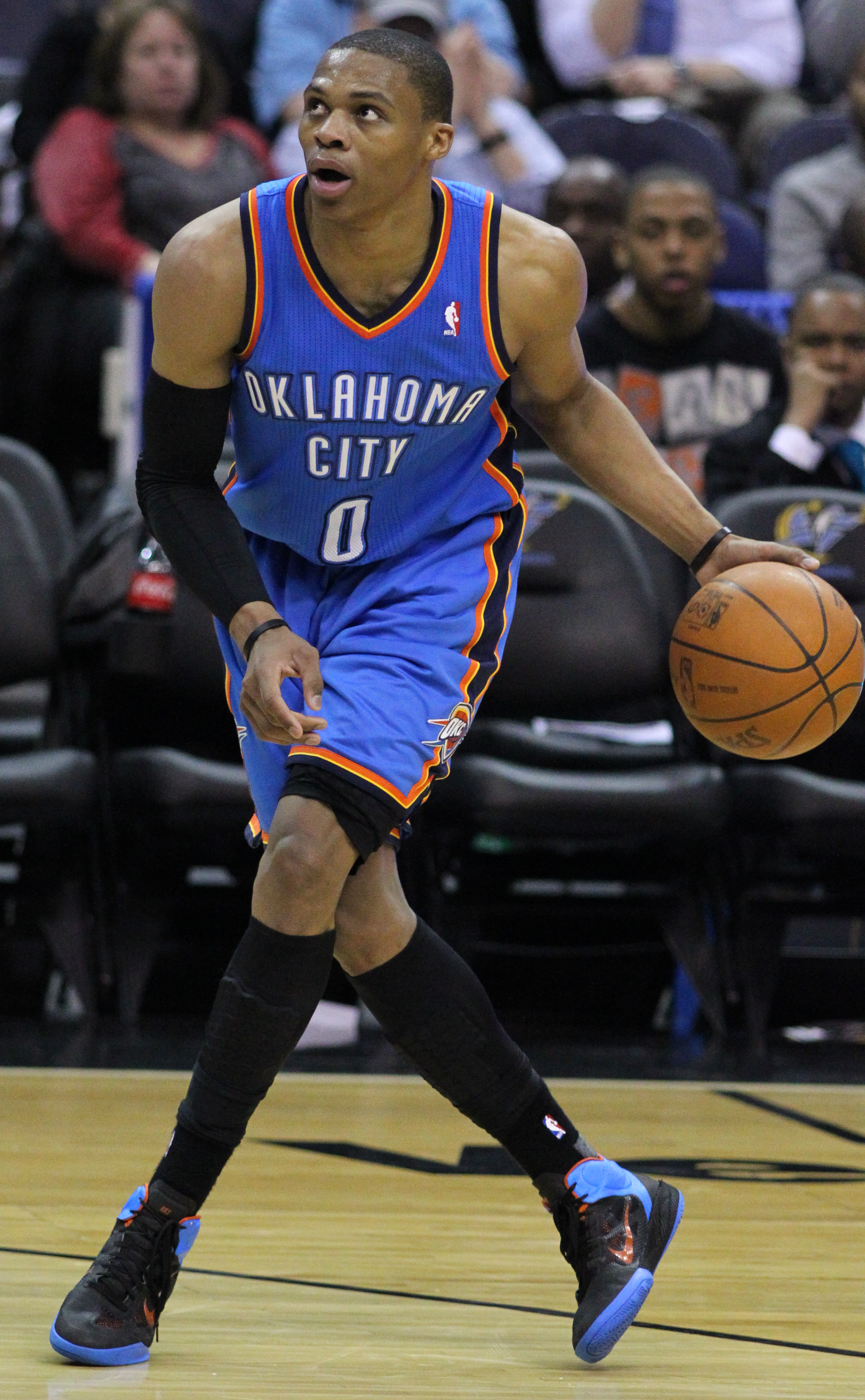
Westbrook drives to the basket in March 2011.

Westbrook was once again selected for the NBA All-Star Game. He finished the 2012–13 season averaging 23.2 points, 7.4 assists, 5.2 rebounds, and 1.8 steals per game. Westbrook helped lead the Oklahoma City Thunder to the playoffs and the first seed in the Western Conference. They would go on to face the 8th seed Houston Rockets in the first round. On April 25, 2013, in the second game of the series, Westbrook injured his right knee when Rockets guard Patrick Beverley collided with him in an attempt to steal the ball. Although Westbrook was clearly bothered by the injury, he would continue playing and finished the game with 29 points. It was revealed the next day that he had suffered a slight tear in his right meniscus. He had surgery on April 27, 2013, and was declared out for the rest of the playoffs. Without Westbrook, the Thunder defeated the Rockets in six games, but fell to the Memphis Grizzlies in five games in the next round. Westbrook was named to the All-NBA Second Team for the third consecutive year.

==== Multiple surgeries and comeback (2013–15) ====
Prior to the start of the 2013–14 season, Westbrook had a second surgery on his right knee, which set back his return to basketball. Despite reports that he would miss the first two weeks of the regular season, Westbrook only missed the first two games before returning to action. On December 26, however, it was announced that Westbrook would undergo arthroscopic surgery on his right knee and would be out until after the All-Star break. The Thunder were able to remain competitive despite his absence due mainly to Kevin Durant's stellar play. Westbrook returned to the lineup on February 20, 2014. He played the rest of the season on limited minutes and sat out the second night of back-to-backs.

Westbrook and the Thunder finished with a 59–23 record, earning the second seed in the Western Conference. They advanced to the Western Conference Finals, where they faced the San Antonio Spurs. On May 27, 2014, in a Game 4 victory, Westbrook recorded 40 points, 5 rebounds, 10 assists and 5 steals. The Thunder lost the series to the eventual NBA champion Spurs in six games. Westbrook averaged 26.7 points, 8.1 assists, and 7.3 rebounds in the postseason.

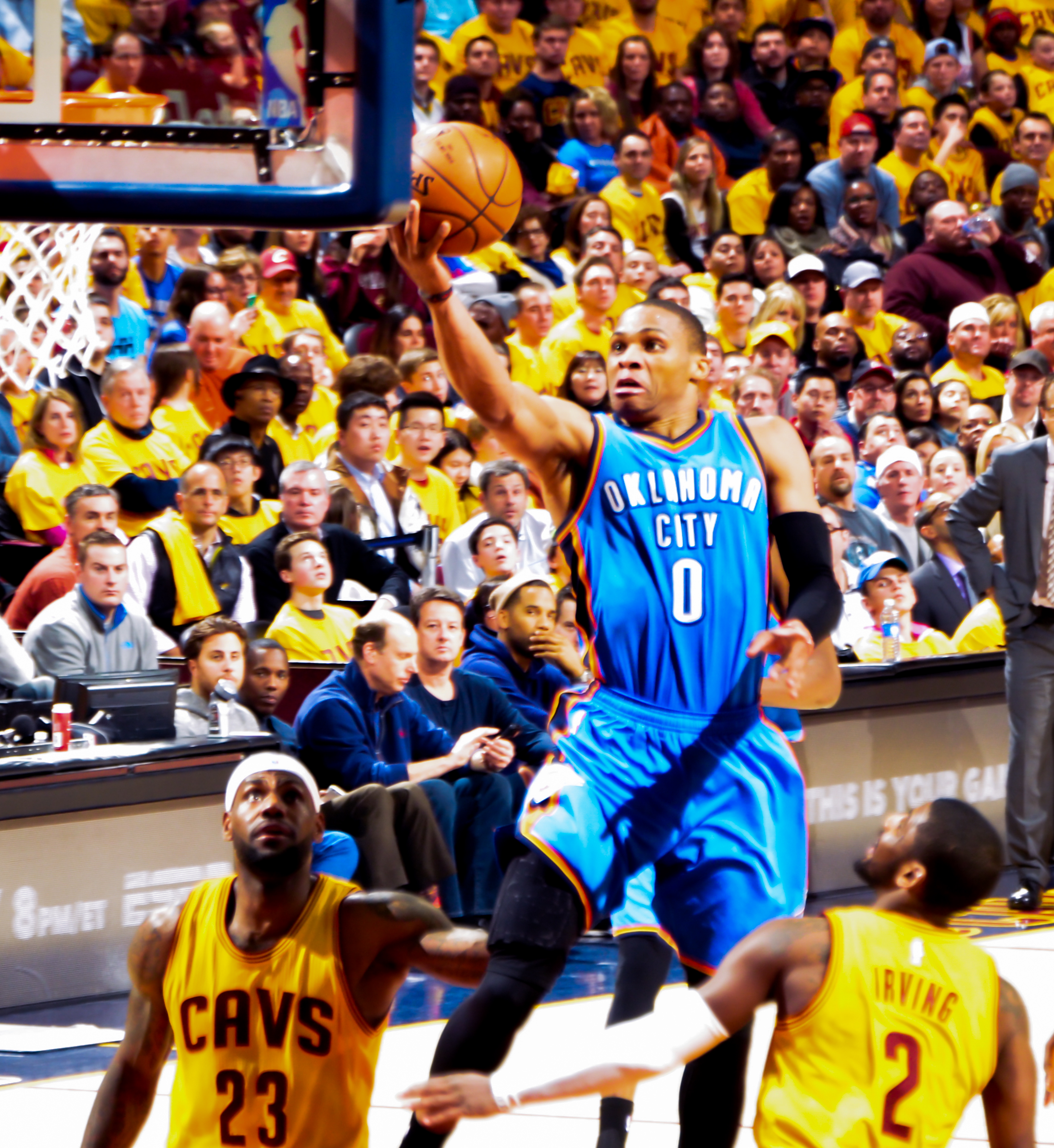
Westbrook goes up for a layup against Cleveland in January 2015

After scoring 38 points in a 106–89 loss to the Portland Trail Blazers in the 2014–15 season opener, Westbrook suffered a small fracture of the second metacarpal in his right hand the following game against the Los Angeles Clippers. He missed 14 games with the injury. With Westbrook and Durant both inactive due to injuries, the Thunder amassed a 4–12 record prior to Westbrook's return on November 28. In Westbrook's first game back, he led the Thunder to a win over the New York Knicks with 32 points. Durant returned the following game to face the New Orleans Pelicans, and the pair helped the Thunder go on a seven-game winning streak to return to playoff contention.

After tying a career-high 45 points on February 4, 2015, in a 102–91 win over the New Orleans Pelicans, Westbrook broke that mark to score a new career high of 48 points two days later, this time in a 116–113 loss to the Pelicans. After being injured the previous year, Westbrook returned to the All-Star Game in 2015. He tallied 41 points and was named the All-Star MVP. On February 27, in a loss to the Portland Trail Blazers, Westbrook recorded 40 points, 13 rebounds and 11 assists to become the first player to have three straight triple-doubles since LeBron James did so in 2009.

On March 4, Westbrook set career highs with 49 points and 16 rebounds. He added 10 assists for his fourth consecutive triple-double, helping the Thunder defeat the Philadelphia 76ers 123–118 in overtime. His streak came to an end the following night against the Chicago Bulls as he recorded 43 points, 8 rebounds and 7 assists in a 105–108 loss. On April 12, he scored a career-high 54 points on 21-of-43 shooting in a losing effort to the Indiana Pacers. He went on to help the Thunder win the team's final two games of the 2014–15 season; nevertheless, the team missed the playoffs, finishing ninth in the West with a 45–37 record.

==== Second All-Star Game MVP and coming up short (2015–16) ====
On October 30, 2015, to begin the 2015–16 season, Westbrook and Durant each scored 40 points against the Orlando Magic. On January 4, Westbrook was named Western Conference co-Player of the Month for December alongside Durant.

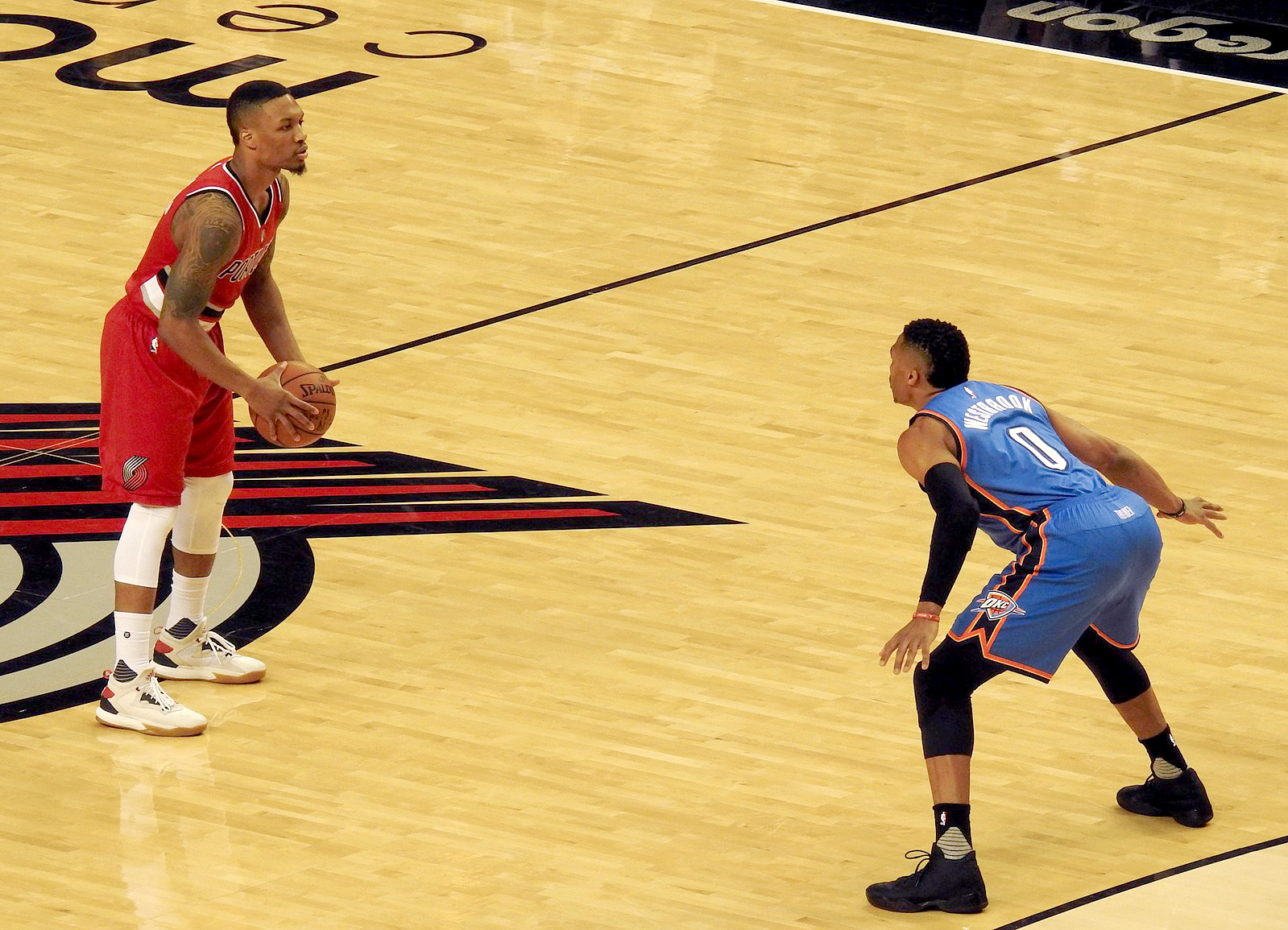
Westbrook defending Damian Lillard in January 2016

Westbrook was voted to start in his first All-Star Game in 2016, and he earned his second All-Star Game MVP award in a 196–173 win by the West. He recorded 31 points, eight rebounds, five assists and five steals in 22 minutes, and became the first player in All-Star history to win consecutive MVPs outright. On March 22, he recorded his 15th triple-double of the season and 34th of his career with 21 points, 15 assists and 13 rebounds in a 111–107 win over the Houston Rockets, amassing the most triple-doubles by a player in a season since 1988–89, when Magic Johnson had 17 and Michael Jordan had 15.

In the playoffs, Westbrook helped guide the Thunder past the Dallas Mavericks in the first round and the San Antonio Spurs in the second round. In the Western Conference Finals, they faced the defending champion Golden State Warriors, taking home court advantage after stealing Game 1 of the series on the road. With the series tied at 1–1 after Game 2, the Thunder returned home and took a 3–1 advantage with two home wins. In Game 4, Westbrook recorded his fifth career playoff triple-double with 36 points, 11 rebounds and 11 assists in a 118–94 win. Despite leading the series 3–1, the Thunder were defeated four games to three by the Warriors to bow out of the playoffs.

==== MVP and first triple-double season (2016–17) ====
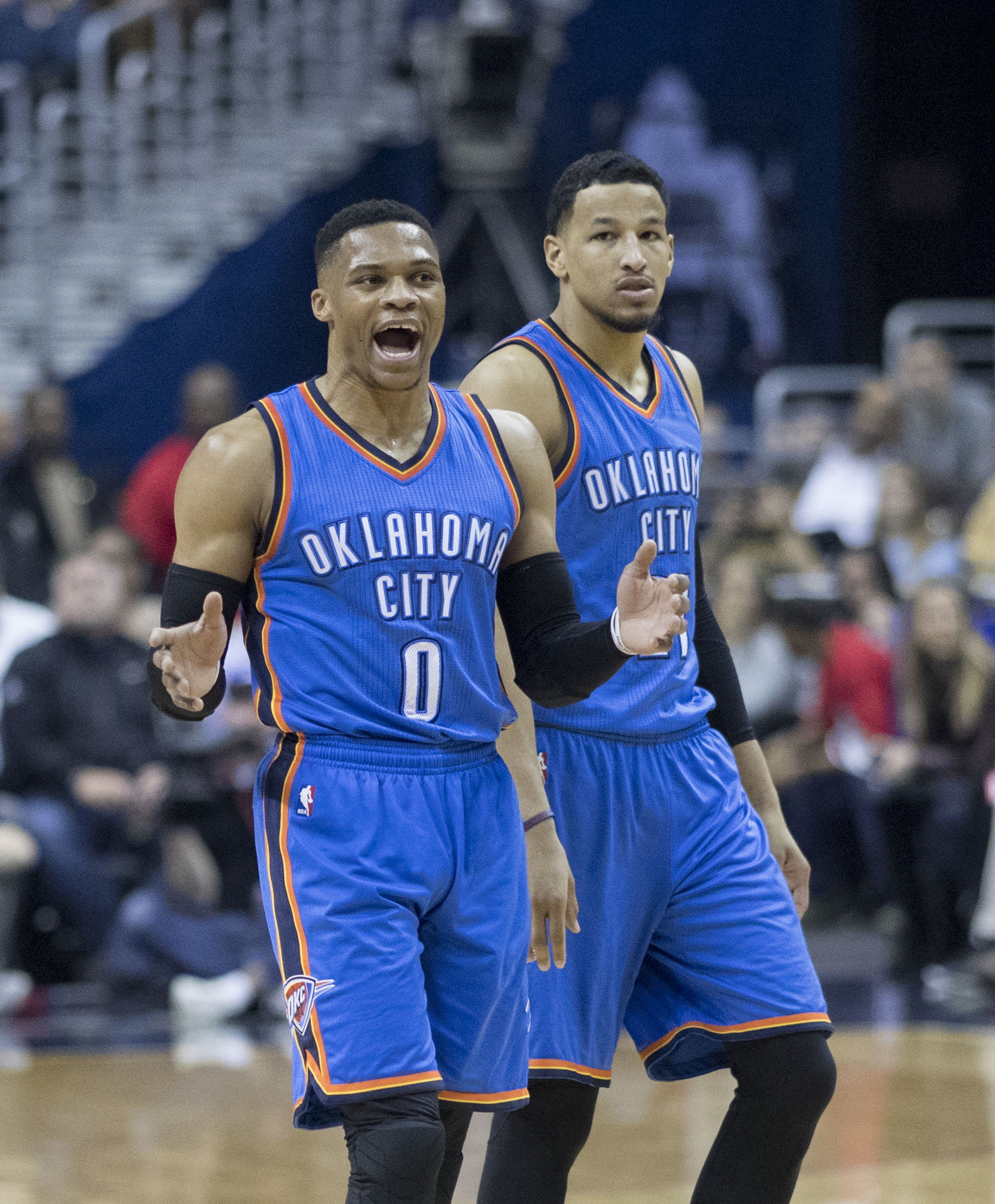
Westbrook with André Roberson in February 2017

Following the off-season departure of Durant, trade speculation began swirling around Westbrook, whose contract was set to expire in 2017. The Thunder were determined to keep Westbrook and held off all trade talks in order to work out an extension. On August 4, 2016, Westbrook signed a three-year, $85.7 million contract extension with the Thunder. He became the focal point of the team. On December 9, Westbrook recorded his seventh straight triple-double with 27 points, 10 rebounds and 10 assists in a 102–99 loss to the Houston Rockets. This streak was the longest triple-double streak since Michael Jordan had seven straight triple-doubles in 1989.

On January 23, Westbrook hit a pull-up jumper with 1.4 seconds left to lift the Thunder to a 97–95 win over the Utah Jazz. He finished with 38 points, 10 rebounds and 10 assists for his 22nd triple-double of the season. Two days later, he had 27 points, 12 rebounds and 10 assists in a 114–105 win over the New Orleans Pelicans, thus passing Larry Bird with his 60th career triple-double.

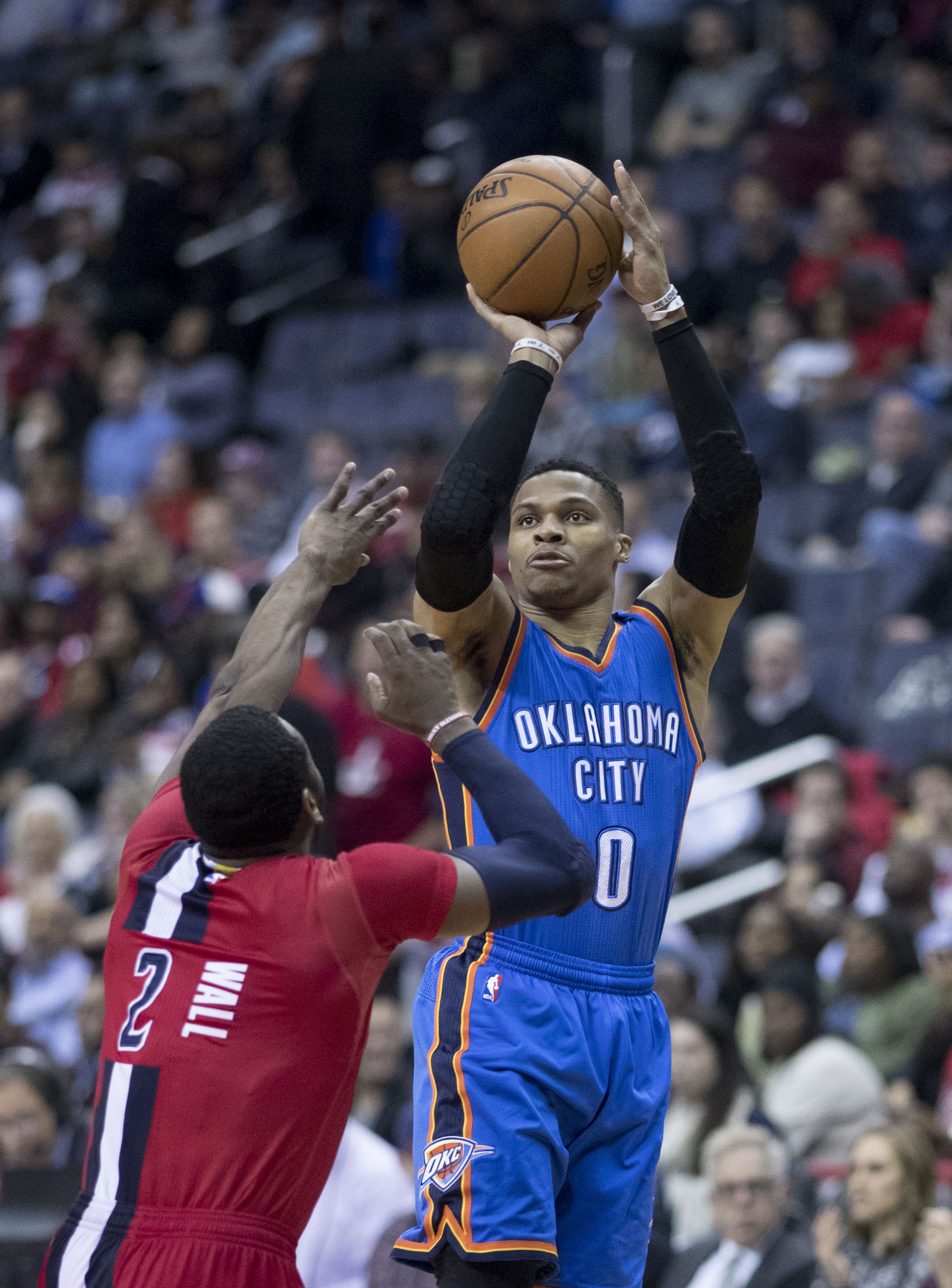
Westbrook shooting over Washington's John Wall in February 2017

On March 7, Westbrook's career-high 58 points was not enough to lift the Thunder over the Portland Trail Blazers, losing 126–121. Westbrook went on to tie Oscar Robertson's single-season record of 41 triple-doubles on April 4 against the Milwaukee Bucks. His historic 42nd triple-double, breaking Robertson's record of most triple-doubles in a season, came in a 106–105 road victory against the Denver Nuggets on April 9 in which the team overcame a 14-point deficit. Westbrook scored 18 of his 50 points, including a 36-foot game-winning buzzer-beater, in the game's last five minutes. Westbrook became just the second player in NBA history to average a triple-double for a season, after Oscar Robertson. The Thunder finished the regular season with a 47–35 record and entered the playoffs as the sixth seed.

On April 19, in Game 2 of the Thunder's first-round playoff series against the Rockets, Westbrook had 51 points. Despite his efforts, the Thunder lost 115–111 to go down 2–0 in the series. In Game 4 four days later, Westbrook had 35 points, 14 rebounds and 14 assists, but could not lead the Thunder to a win, as they went down 3–1 in the series with a 113–109 loss. With a loss to the Rockets in Game 5, the Thunder bowed out of the playoffs with a 4–1 series defeat. Westbrook had 47 points in Game 5.

On June 26, 2017, Westbrook was named the recipient of the NBA Most Valuable Player Award. He was the first winner from a team with fewer than 50 wins since Moses Malone in 1982.

==== Second triple-double season and playoff disappointment (2017–18) ====
On September 29, 2017, Westbrook signed a five-year, $205 million contract extension with the Thunder. The deal started with the 2018–19 season and delivered Westbrook the largest guaranteed contract in NBA history at the time—six seasons and $233 million through 2022–23. The contract included a player option for the 2022–23 season. Continuing on from his historic 2016–17 season, Westbrook had a triple-double in the Thunder's season opener against the New York Knicks on October 19. Playing alongside new All-Star teammates Paul George and Carmelo Anthony, Westbrook had 21 points, 10 rebounds and 16 assists in a 105–84 win. After starting the season with an 8–12 record, the Thunder improved to 20–15 with a 124–107 win over the Toronto Raptors on December 27. Westbrook had 30 points, 13 assists and eight rebounds against the Raptors as the Thunder won their sixth straight game.

On March 13, 2018, Westbrook recorded 32 points, 12 assists and 12 rebounds in a 119–107 win over the Atlanta Hawks, becoming the fourth player in NBA history to record 100 triple-doubles, joining Oscar Robertson (181 triple-doubles), Magic Johnson (138) and Jason Kidd (107). On April 9, Westbrook recorded his 25th triple-double of the season with 23 points, 18 rebounds and 13 assists in a 115–93 win over the Miami Heat, helping the Thunder clinch a playoff spot. Westbrook finished the season as the league leader in assists per game, averaging 10.3 per game, and he was named to the All-NBA Second Team. In Game 5 of the Thunder's first-round playoff series against the Utah Jazz, Westbrook scored 33 of his 45 points in the second half as Oklahoma City rallied from 25 points down to fight off elimination and beat the Jazz 107–99. He also had 15 rebounds and seven assists. In Game 6, Westbrook scored 46 points in a 96–91 loss, as the Thunder bowed out of the playoffs with a 4–2 defeat.

==== Third triple-double season and final season in Oklahoma City (2018–19) ====
Westbrook missed the preseason and the first two regular season games of the 2018–2019 season after undergoing a procedure in September 2018 to deal with inflammation in his right knee. In his season debut for the Thunder on October 21, Westbrook had 32 points, 12 rebounds and eight assists in 35 minutes in a 131–120 loss to the Sacramento Kings. On November 19, he returned to the line-up after missing five games with a left ankle sprain and had 29 points and 13 assists in a 117–113 loss to the Kings. On January 10, 2019, he recorded a career-high 24 assists to go with 24 points and 13 rebounds in a 154–147 double-overtime loss to the San Antonio Spurs.

On January 31, Westbrook received his eighth career All-Star selection by being named a Western Conference reserve. On February 11, Westbrook broke Wilt Chamberlain's record for consecutive triple-doubles after tallying 21 points, 14 rebounds and 11 assists in a 120–111 win over the Portland Trail Blazers. On February 14, he recorded 44 points, 14 rebounds and 11 assists in a 131–122 loss to the New Orleans Pelicans. In addition to increasing his triple-double streak, Westbrook surpassed Gary Payton (18,207 points) as the career scoring leader in franchise history. His streak of 11 consecutive games with a triple-double ended in the first game after the All-Star break, as he recorded 43 points, 15 rebounds and eight assists in a 148–147 double-overtime win over the Utah Jazz.

On March 17, Westbrook was suspended for one game without pay for receiving his 16th technical foul of the season. On April 2, Westbrook had 20 points, 20 rebounds and 21 assists in a 119–103 win over the Los Angeles Lakers. He became the second player in NBA history to record 20 points, 20 rebounds and 20 assists in a single game, after Wilt Chamberlain. Westbrook led the league in assists per game for the third consecutive season. The Thunder went on to lose in five games to the Trail Blazers in the first round of the playoffs. It was the third straight season in which the team was eliminated in the first round.

=== Houston Rockets (2019–2020) ===
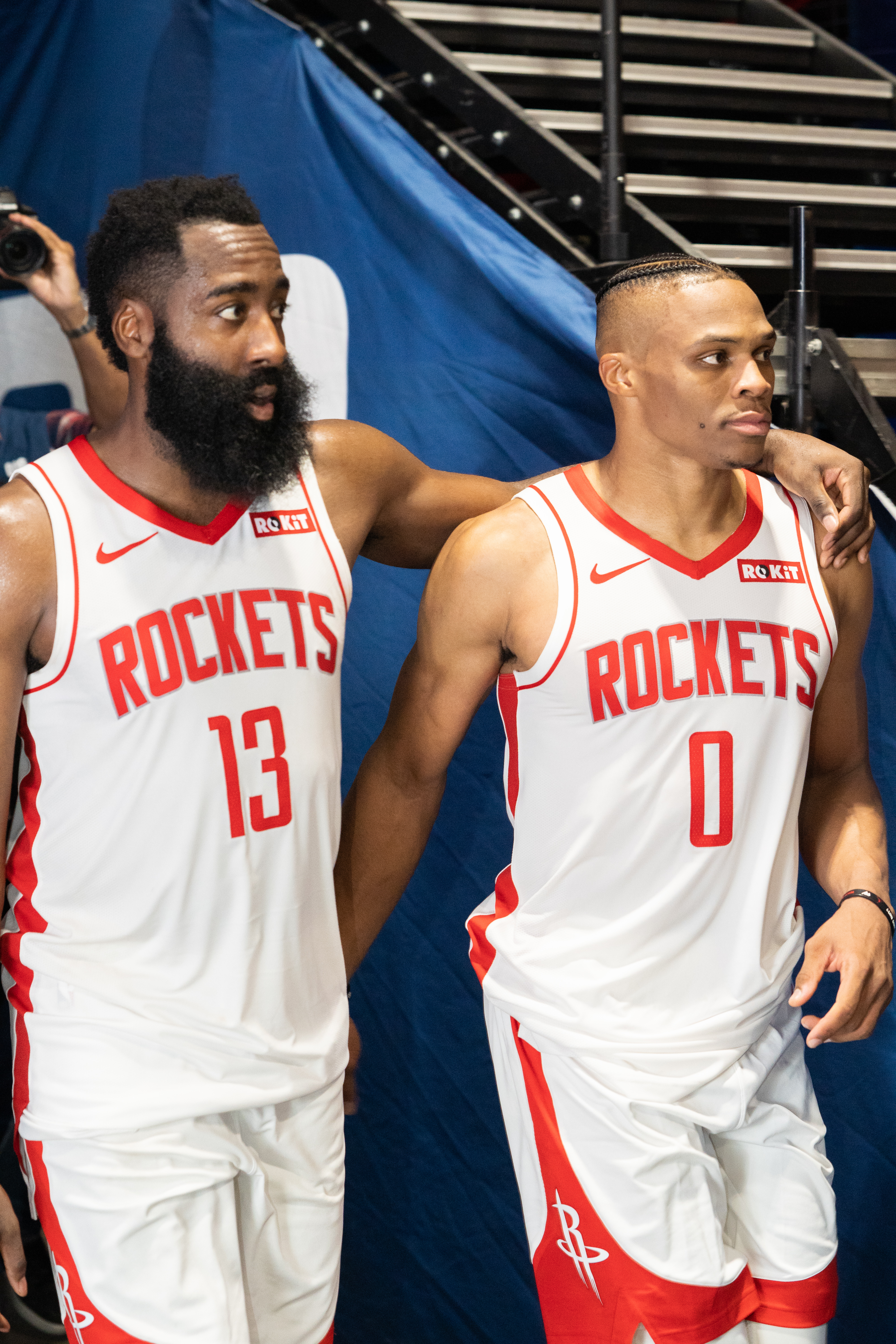
Westbrook reunited with former Thunder teammate James Harden in Houston, pictured here in October 2019

On July 16, 2019, Westbrook was traded to the Houston Rockets for All-Star Chris Paul, two protected first-round picks, and two first-round pick swaps. The move reunited Westbrook with former Thunder teammate James Harden; the two players both expressed mutual interest and enthusiasm in playing together at this stage in their careers. Harden spent his first three seasons in the league (2009–2012) on the Thunder with Westbrook. They had played together in the 2012 NBA Finals.

Westbrook made his Rockets debut in a 117–111 loss against the Milwaukee Bucks on October 24, 2019, leading the team with 24 points, 16 rebounds and seven assists in 33 minutes of play. In Westbrook's second game as a Rocket on October 26, 2019, he became second all time in career triple-doubles, passing Magic Johnson with a 28-point, 13-assist and 10-rebound performance in a 126–123 win against the New Orleans Pelicans.

On January 9, 2020, Westbrook made his return to Oklahoma City for the first time as a visitor, scoring 34 points, grabbing 2 rebounds, and passing for 5 assists on 14-of-26 shooting from the field in a 113–92 loss. With his triple-double against Oklahoma City on January 20, he joined LeBron James as the only two players to have logged triple-doubles against all 30 NBA teams.

The suspension of the 2019–20 NBA season began in March due to the COVID-19 pandemic in the United States. In July, Westbrook tested positive for COVID-19. He recovered and rejoined the team later that month in Orlando, Florida, for the league's restart. In the third game following his return, Westbrook strained his right quad and missed four of the five remaining regular season games. In the playoffs, he missed the first four games of the opening series against Oklahoma City. He helped Houston advance to the semifinals, where they were eliminated 4–1 by the Lakers. In his eight playoff games, Westbrook averaged 17.9 points, 7.0 rebounds and 4.6 assists per game, the lowest averages of his postseason career.

=== Washington Wizards (2020–2021) ===
==== Fourth triple-double season and career triple-doubles record (2020–21) ====
On December 2, 2020, amidst rumors that he and Harden were unhappy and wanted out from the Rockets, Westbrook was traded to the Washington Wizards for John Wall and a 2023 lottery-protected first-round draft pick.

Westbrook was not selected to the 2021 NBA All-Star Game, missing the event for the first time since 2014. On March 29, 2021, he recorded 35 points, 14 rebounds and a then-season-high 21 assists in a 132–124 win over the Indiana Pacers, becoming the first player since Magic Johnson in 1988 to post a 30–10–20 triple-double. His 16th triple-double in just his 38th game with Washington broke Darrell Walker's franchise record for career triple-doubles, which had stood for 30 years.

On May 4, Westbrook recorded 14 points, a career-high 21 rebounds and a then-season-high 24 assists in a 154–141 win over the Pacers. On May 10, he posted 28 points, 13 rebounds and 21 assists in a 125–124 loss to the Atlanta Hawks, recording his 182nd career triple-double and surpassing Oscar Robertson for the most triple-doubles in NBA history.

Westbrook finished the regular season averaging 22.2 points, a career-high 11.5 rebounds and a league-leading, career-high 11.7 assists per game, earning his third NBA assist title and averaging a triple-double for the fourth time in five seasons. Alongside Westbrook, backcourt teammate Bradley Beal averaged a career-high 31.3 points per game, finishing second in the scoring race to Stephen Curry.

After losing to the Boston Celtics in the play-in tournament for the Eastern Conference's seventh seed, Westbrook and Beal led the Wizards to a 142–115 victory over the Pacers to secure the conference's eighth seed and Washington's first playoff appearance since 2018. The Wizards were eliminated by the top-seeded Philadelphia 76ers in five games during the first round of the 2021 NBA playoffs.

=== Los Angeles Lakers (2021–2023) ===
==== Down season (2021–22) ====
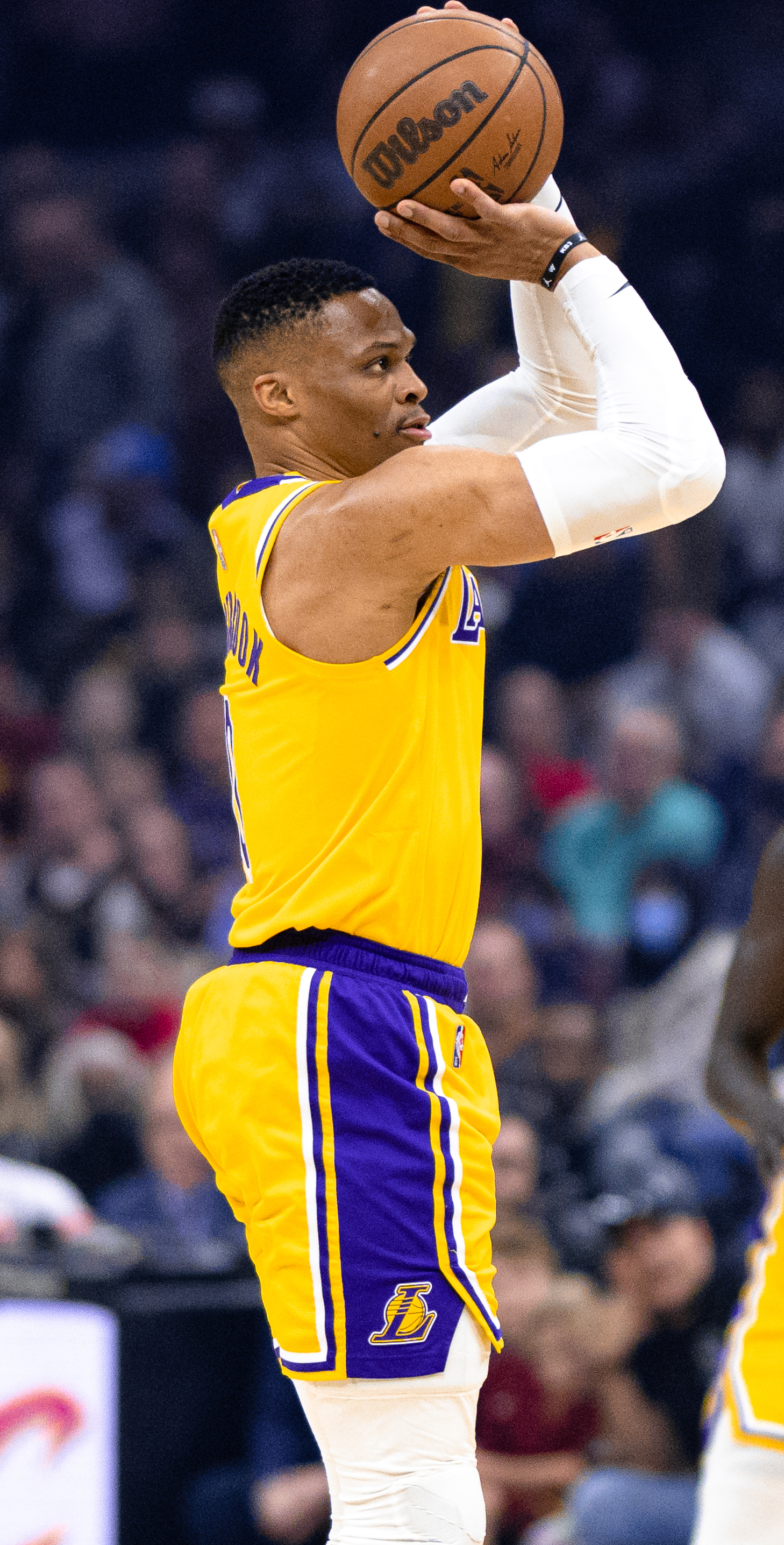
Westbrook takes a shot in March 2022

On August 6, 2021, Westbrook was traded to the Los Angeles Lakers for Kentavious Caldwell-Pope, Kyle Kuzma, Montrezl Harrell and the draft rights to Isaiah Jackson. This was the third time Westbrook was traded, and the Lakers became his fourth team in three years. On October 19, Westbrook made his Lakers debut, putting up eight points on 4-of-12 shooting from the field, five rebounds and three assists in a 121–114 loss to the Golden State Warriors.

As his first season with the Lakers progressed, Westbrook received criticism for his perceived poor quality of play. Westbrook was criticized following a 4-for-20 shooting performance in a 122–115 loss to the Brooklyn Nets on Christmas Day. The Lakers had a 21–20 record at the halfway point of the regular season, and Westbrook was often a recipient of the blame for the team's struggles relative to its 2020 championship season. Westbrook shot 30 percent from the three-point line and turned the ball over 4.6 times per game through early January, and he received criticism for a particular game against the Minnesota Timberwolves where he turned the ball over nine times. Westbrook later responded to critics, saying that they were only looking at the stat sheet and not his overall play on the court.

On January 4, 2022, in a 122–114 win over the Sacramento Kings, Westbrook had his first game without turnovers since March 14, 2016. On January 19, he was benched by Lakers head coach Frank Vogel in the final four minutes of a home loss against the Indiana Pacers.

On April 5, 2022, the Lakers were defeated, 121–110, by the Phoenix Suns. This defeat eliminated the team from obtaining a playoff berth. The 2021–22 season was the third season in Westbrook's career (and the first since 2015) in which he missed the playoffs. Vogel was fired after the season. Following Vogel's firing, Westbrook said, "I'm not sure what his issue was with me." The coach had kept him in the starting lineup all season despite pressure to bring him off the bench. Westbrook attended new head coach Darvin Ham's introductory press conference, where the coach said "Russell Westbrook is one of the best players our league has ever seen, and there's still a ton left in the tank." He said a common theme of their meetings was "sacrifice". Westbrook opted in to the final year of his contract for 2022–23, valued at $47 million.

==== Sixth man role (2022–23) ====
After severing ties with agent Thad Foucher of Wasserman in July 2022, Westbrook signed Jeff Schwartz of Excel Sports as his agent on August 1, 2022. During the off-season, the Lakers acquired point guards Patrick Beverley and Dennis Schröder. On October 28, Westbrook came off the bench for the first time since his rookie season and chipped in with 18 points and eight rebounds in a 111–102 loss to the Minnesota Timberwolves. On November 2, 2022, CBS Sports reported that Westbrook had described his new role coming off the bench as "'beneficial for everybody'". On November 12, the Lakers' record was 2–10 and they stood in last place in the Western Conference. Claire de Lune of The Guardian provided the following November 16 analysis of Westbrook's fit with the Lakers:

Like many relationships, the Lakers and Westbrook felt doomed from the start. Sure, when Westbrook arrived in Los Angeles, which happens to be his home town, for training camp in September of last year, the veteran point guard was coming off of an impressive season with the Washington Wizards. But the fit issues with the existing roster, especially James and Davis, were already glaring. Westbrook has never been known for his shooting accuracy, and is notorious for playing best in situations where he can be the ball-dominant scorer and orchestrator of the offense. He’s also never been outstanding defensively. After 20 seasons of watching James in the NBA, one formula has remained battle-tested and proven: surround him with shooters to space the floor, a few enthusiastic and hard-nosed defenders, and he will handle the rest. As talented as the one-time NBA MVP Westbrook may be, he is, realistically, none of the above. It was a recipe for disaster, and a disaster it’s been.

On December 9, Westbrook recorded his first career triple-double off the bench with 12 points, 11 rebounds, 11 assists and four steals in a 133–122 overtime loss to the Philadelphia 76ers.

On January 15, 2023, Westbrook put up 20 points, 14 rebounds and 11 assists off the bench in a 113–112 loss to the Philadelphia 76ers. It was his fourth career triple-double off the bench, which set a record for the most triple-doubles off the bench in NBA history. On January 20, Westbrook had 29 points, five rebounds and six assists, as the Lakers rallied a 122–121 win to snap the Memphis Grizzlies' winning streak at 11 games. On January 30, Westbrook made his 8,967th career assist in a 121–104 loss to the Brooklyn Nets, surpassing Gary Payton for tenth place in the all-time career assists list.

On February 9, 2023, Westbrook was traded to the Utah Jazz in a three-team trade involving the Minnesota Timberwolves. At the time of the trade, he was averaging 15.9 points, 7.5 assists and 6.2 rebounds with the Lakers on 41.7% shooting in a career-low 28.7 minutes per game.

Following the trade, Sam Quinn of CBS Sports opined that Westbrook's level of success coming off the bench for the Lakers was "a matter of debate":

Westbrook quickly became the betting favorite to win Sixth Man of the Year, but the Lakers still never reached .500 with him on the team this season. Lineups with him and without him performed similarly, his tendency towards turnovers and poor shot-selection persisted and he was still often benched late in games.

=== Los Angeles Clippers (2023–2024) ===
On February 20, Westbrook and the Utah Jazz reached a contract buyout agreement; he did not play in any games for the team.

On February 22, 2023, Westbrook signed with the Los Angeles Clippers, reuniting with his former Thunder teammate Paul George. Westbrook became a starter with the Clippers. On February 24, Westbrook made his Clippers debut, putting up 17 points and 14 assists in a 176–175 double overtime loss to the Sacramento Kings, the second-highest-scoring game in NBA history. According to Bleacher Report, Westbrook "looked rejuvenated" after joining the Clippers.

On March 5, Westbrook won his first game as a member of the Clippers with a 135–129 come-from-behind victory against the Memphis Grizzlies. On March 11, Westbrook made his 9,062nd career assist in a 106–95 win over the New York Knicks, surpassing Isiah Thomas for ninth place in the all-time career assists list. During the regular season, Westbrook averaged 15.8 points, 4.9 rebounds and 7.6 assists while shooting 48.9 percent from the field for the Clippers. In July 2023, Coach Tyronn Lue praised Westbrook's effort and toughness, saying that Westbrook had "saved" the Clippers during the final 20 games of the regular season following injuries to Paul George and others.

The Clippers faced the Phoenix Suns in the first round of the 2023 NBA playoffs. On April 22, in Game 4 of the Clippers–Suns series, Westbrook scored 37 points in a 112–100 loss. Despite Westbrook averaging 23.6 points, 7.6 rebounds and 7.4 assists per game in the playoffs, the Clippers were eliminated by the Suns in five games.

On July 6, 2023, the Clippers re-signed Westbrook to a two-year, $7.8 million contract. After the Clippers' blockbuster trade for James Harden, Westbrook requested to come off the bench, mainly to save a six-game losing streak the Clippers were experiencing at the time. On January 1, 2024, Westbrook passed Patrick Ewing for 25th place on the league's all-time scoring list. On February 2, Westbrook scored 23 points and delivered nine assists to become the 25th player in NBA history with 25,000 career points in a 136–125 win over the Detroit Pistons. He and James Harden became the third pair of 25,000-point scorers to play together in NBA history. They joined LeBron James and Carmelo Anthony for the 2021–22 Lakers and Kevin Garnett and Paul Pierce for the 2013–14 Nets. On April 9, Westbrook recorded his first triple-double as a member of the Los Angeles Clippers with 16 points, 15 rebounds and 15 assists in a 105–92 win over the Phoenix Suns.

On April 26, 2024, Westbrook was ejected after being assessed with two technical fouls for fouling Luka Dončić and shoving P. J. Washington in Game Three of the first round of the playoffs against the Dallas Mavericks a 101–90 loss.

On July 18, 2024, Westbrook, alongside the draft rights to Balša Koprivica, a second-round pick swap and cash considerations, was traded to the Utah Jazz in exchange for Kris Dunn in a sign-and-trade. He was then waived on July 20.

=== Denver Nuggets (2024–2025) ===
On July 26, 2024, Westbrook signed with the Denver Nuggets.

On November 6, 2024, Westbrook scored 29 points, along with six rebounds and six assists on 10-of-15 shooting from the field and 3-of-4 from three in a 124–122 win over his former team, the Oklahoma City Thunder. On November 19, Westbrook put up his 200th career triple-double with 12 points, 10 rebounds, and 14 assists in a 122–110 win over the Memphis Grizzlies, becoming the first player in NBA history to achieve 200 career triple-doubles. On December 30, Westbrook put up a triple-double with 16 points, 10 rebounds, and 10 assists in a 132–121 win over the Utah Jazz. He posted the triple-double without a missed field goal or a turnover. Westbrook became just the third player in NBA history to record a triple double with no missed shots and no turnovers, the third to achieve that feat, joining Nikola Jokić and Domantas Sabonis.

On January 10, 2025, Westbrook recorded a triple-double with 25 points, 11 rebounds, and 10 assists in a 124–105 win over the Brooklyn Nets. His teammate Jokić also put up a triple-double with 35 points, 15 assists, and 12 rebounds, lbecoming the first pair of teammates in NBA history to each record a triple-double in the same game multiple times in a season. On March 15, Westbrook logged 22 points and 11 assists in a 126–123 loss against the Washington Wizards, surpassing 26,000 career points and becoming the 21st player to reach the milestone and the second point guard after Oscar Robertson. On March 28, in a 129–93 win over the Utah Jazz, Westbrook passed Oscar Robertson for No. 8 all-time in assists and Kobe Bryant for No. 16 all-time in steals.

During an April 1 game against the Minnesota Timberwolves, Westbrook intercepted a pass, then missed a layup with 17.7 seconds left in the second overtime, with the Nuggets up by one point with the shot clock turned off. He then fouled Timberwolves player Nickeil Alexander-Walker with a tenth of a second left as Alexander-Walker attempted a three-point shot in the corner, allowing Alexander-Walker to make two free throws, resulting in a 140–139 Minnesota victory.

On May 27, 2025, Westbrook underwent surgery on his right hand to repair multiple ligament tears. On June 13, Westbrook declined his $3.4 million player option, thus becoming a free agent.

=== Sacramento Kings (2025–2026) ===
On October 16, 2025, Westbrook signed a one-year, minimum salary contract with the Sacramento Kings. He chose to wear number 18 in order to represent the amount of seasons he played in the NBA. On November 5, Westbrook had his 204th career triple‑double and his first as a King, posting 23 points, 16 rebounds, and 10 assists in a 121–116 victory over the Golden State Warriors. He also achieved 8,734 career rebounds, surpassing Jason Kidd (8,725) for the most career rebounds by a guard in NBA history. On November 14, Westbrook achieved 10,000 career assists in a 124–110 loss to the Minnesota Timberwolves, recording a triple-double with 13 points, 10 rebounds, and 14 assists, and joining LeBron James as the only players in NBA history to reach 25,000 career points and 10,000 career assists. On December 27, Westbrook surpassed Magic Johnson and took seventh place on the NBA’s all-time assists list during a 113–107 win over the Dallas Mavericks. In the same game, he also became the 14th player in NBA history to reach 2,000 career steals.

On January 3, 2026, Westbrook put up 17 points, nine rebounds, and six assists in a 129–102 loss to the Phoenix Suns, surpassing Oscar Robertson to become the point guard with the most career points scored in NBA history and moving into 15th place on the NBA’s all-time scoring list. On February 9, Westbrook scored 17 points in the Kings’ 120–94 loss to the New Orleans Pelicans, surpassing the 27,000-point mark for his NBA career and becoming the 14th player in league history to reach the milestone. On March 9, Westbrook recorded his 208th career triple-double, finishing with 23 points, 11 rebounds and 12 assists while committing zero turnovers to lead the Kings to a 126–110 win over the Chicago Bulls. On March 17, Westbrook surpassed Mark Jackson and Steve Nash and took fifth place on the NBA’s all-time assists list during a game against the San Antonio Spurs.

=== Retirement ===
On August 12, 2026, Westbrook announced his retirement from professional basketball on social media.

== National team career ==
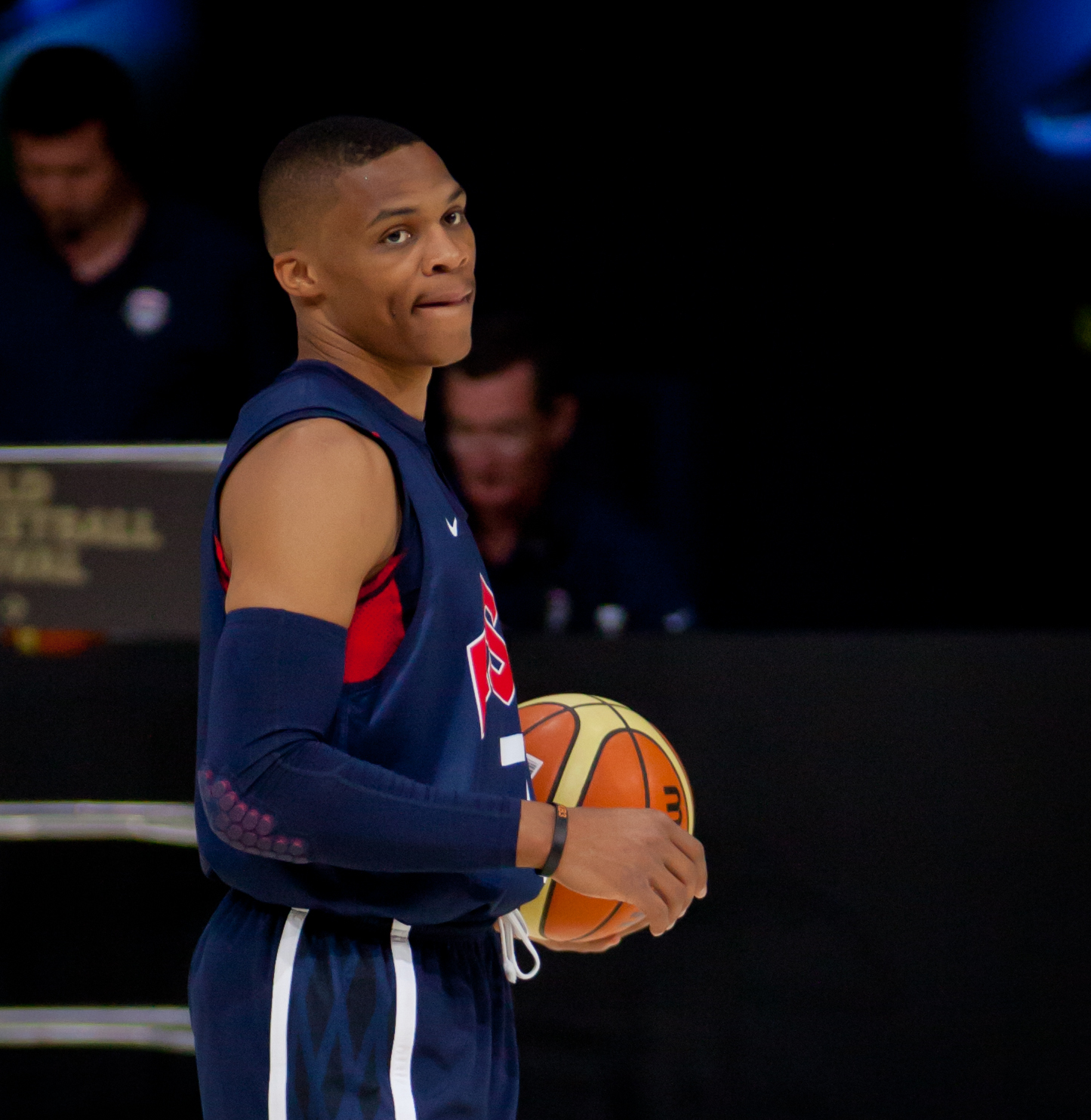
Westbrook with Team USA in 2012

In 2010, Westbrook was selected to the U.S. FIBA World Championship team in Istanbul, Turkey. On a team without a single member from its 2008 Olympic gold-medal team, Westbrook was considered a star on the team. The 2010 team relied heavily on a small lineup, and Westbrook finished in the top five on the team in minutes per game, and top three in points and assists per game. Team USA went 9–0 to win its first World Championship since 1994. The win automatically qualified Team USA for the 2012 Summer Olympics in London, and the U.S.A overtook Argentina for the No. 1 world ranking.

Westbrook was selected to play for the 2012 Summer Olympic team in London, where he won a second gold medal. He declined an invitation to join the 2016 Olympic team.

== Player profile ==
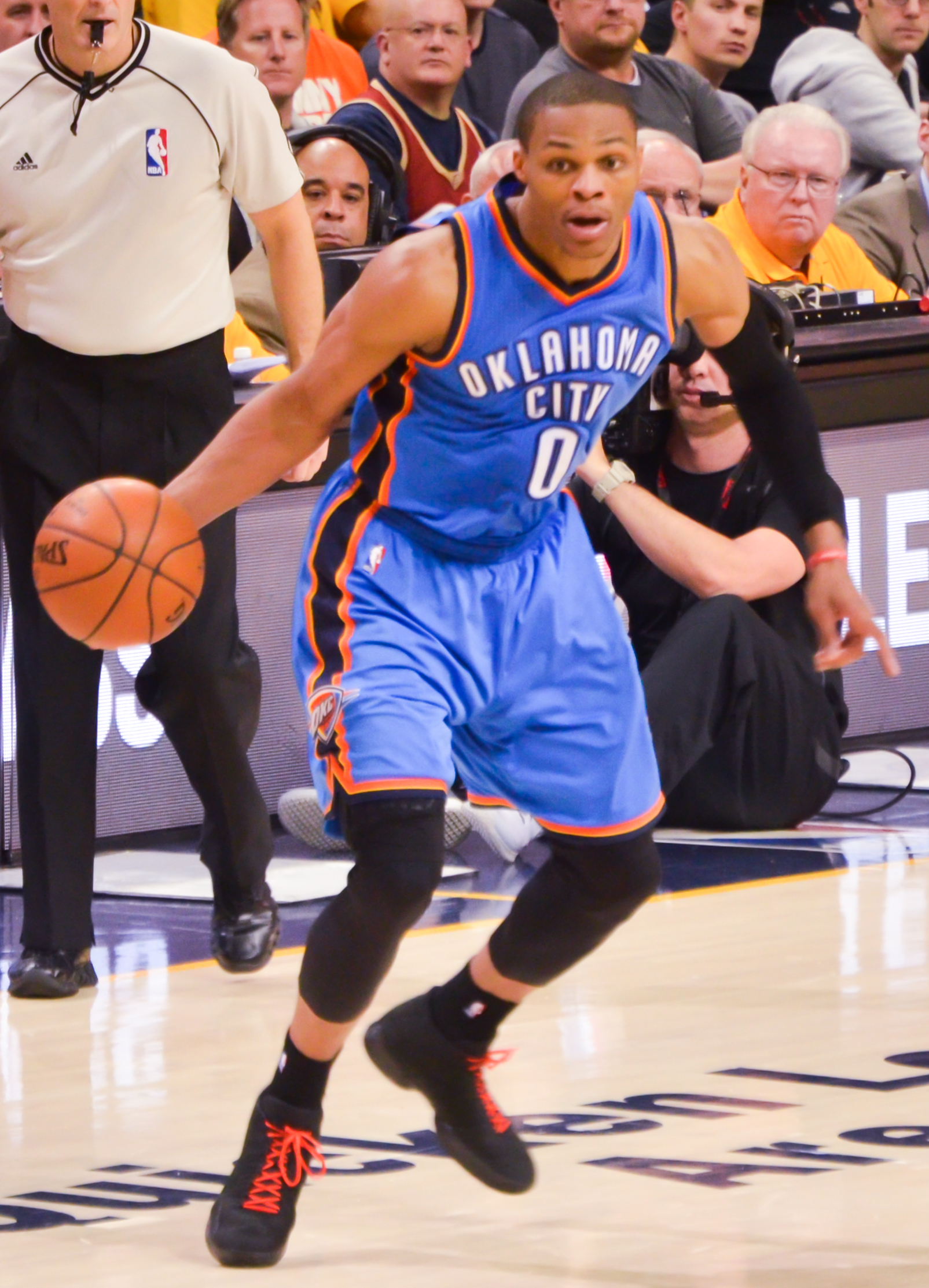
Westbrook dribbling in 2015

Standing at 6 feet 4 inches (1.93 m) tall and weighing 200 pounds (91 kg), Westbrook was a point guard who was widely known for playing at a high level of intensity and for being able to keep that intensity for the majority of his playing time. Westbrook often looked to push the pace of the game for transition points and attack the basket.

Though attacking the rim was Westbrook's forte, he would frequently pull up for medium-range jump shots. He regularly created good scoring opportunities for his teammates, resulting in him averaging over eight assists per game for his career. Despite his intense style of play, and despite having torn his right meniscus in 2013, Westbrook was one of the NBA's most durable players. In his first five years with Oklahoma City, he played in every game.

As of November 6, 2025, Westbrook's 204 regular-season triple-doubles are the most in NBA history. His 12 playoff triple-doubles put him at fourth most all time.

Westbrook's free throw percentage declined in the latter years of his career, coinciding with an NBA rule change implemented before the 2017–18 season. In order to reduce wasted time, the rule stipulated that the free throw shooter may not walk back beyond the three-point line in between free throws. While this did not affect most players, it changed Westbrook's prior routine of walking back nearly to half-court between shots, something he had done since childhood. His free throw percentage dropped from 82.3% for the nine years prior to the rule change, to 68.5% for the 7 1/2 years since (to January 2025).

Westbrook's three-point shooting and turnovers were sometimes mentioned when pundits criticized his play, leading to the nickname "Westbrick". As of January 2025, he averaged 30.5% on three-point field goal attempts and 3.9 turnovers per game during his career. Westbrook was also criticized for his "single-mindedness" and for being uncooperative. However, teammates and former teammates such as Paul George, Austin Reaves and Bradley Beal praised him for his leadership and strong work ethic.

== Career statistics ==
Legend
GP	Games played	GS	Games started	MPG	Minutes per game
FG%	Field goal percentage	3P%	3-point field goal percentage	FT%	Free throw percentage
RPG	Rebounds per game	APG	Assists per game	SPG	Steals per game
BPG	Blocks per game	PPG	Points per game	**Bold**	Career high
*	Led the league

=== NBA ===
==== Regular season ====
Year	Team	GP	GS	MPG	FG%	3P%	FT%	RPG	APG	SPG	BPG	PPG
2008–09	Oklahoma City	**82***	65	32.5	.398	.271	.815	4.9	5.3	1.3	.2	15.3
2009–10	Oklahoma City	**82***	**82***	34.3	.418	.221	.780	4.9	8.0	1.3	.4	16.1
2010–11	Oklahoma City	**82**	**82***	34.7	.442	.330	.842	4.6	8.2	1.9	.4	21.9
2011–12	Oklahoma City	66*	66*	35.3	.457	.316	.823	4.6	5.5	1.7	.3	23.6
2012–13	Oklahoma City	**82***	**82***	34.9	.438	.323	.800	5.2	7.4	1.8	.3	23.2
2013–14	Oklahoma City	46	46	30.7	.437	.318	.826	5.7	6.9	1.9	.2	21.8
2014–15	Oklahoma City	67	67	34.4	.426	.299	.835	7.3	8.6	**2.1**	.2	28.1*
2015–16	Oklahoma City	80	80	34.4	.454	.296	.812	7.8	10.4	2.0	.3	23.5
2016–17	Oklahoma City	81	81	34.6	.425	.343	**.845**	10.7	10.4	1.6	.4	**31.6***
2017–18	Oklahoma City	80	80	**36.4**	.449	.298	.737	10.1	10.3*	1.8	.3	25.4
2018–19	Oklahoma City	73	73	36.0	.428	.290	.656	11.1	10.7*	1.9	**.5**	22.9
2019–20	Houston	57	57	36.0	.472	.258	.763	7.9	7.0	1.6	.4	27.2
2020–21	Washington	65	65	**36.4**	.439	.315	.656	**11.5**	**11.7***	1.4	.4	22.2
2021–22	L.A. Lakers	78	78	34.3	.444	.298	.667	7.4	7.1	1.0	.3	18.5
2022–23	L.A. Lakers	52	3	28.7	.417	.296	.655	6.2	7.5	1.0	.4	15.9
2022–23	L.A. Clippers	21	21	30.2	**.489**	**.356**	.658	4.9	7.6	1.1	**.5**	15.8
2023–24	L.A. Clippers	68	11	22.5	.454	.273	.688	5.0	4.5	1.1	.3	11.1
2024–25	Denver	75	36	27.9	.449	.323	.661	4.9	6.1	1.4	**.5**	13.3
2025–26	Sacramento	64	58	29.0	.427	.338	.694	5.4	6.7	1.3	.2	15.2
Career		1,301	1,133	33.1	.438	.308	.771	6.9	8.0	1.6	.3	20.9
All-Star		9	2	22.5	.506	.338	.588	5.2	3.8	1.4	.0	21.6

==== Playoffs ====
Year	Team	GP	GS	MPG	FG%	3P%	FT%	RPG	APG	SPG	BPG	PPG
2010	Oklahoma City	6	6	35.4	**.473**	**.417**	.842	6.0	6.0	1.7	.2	20.5
2011	Oklahoma City	17	17	37.5	.394	.292	.852	5.4	6.4	1.4	.4	23.8
2012	Oklahoma City	**20**	**20**	38.4	.435	.277	.802	5.5	5.8	1.6	.4	23.1
2013	Oklahoma City	2	2	33.8	.415	.222	.857	6.5	7.0	**3.0**	.0	24.0
2014	Oklahoma City	19	19	38.7	.420	.280	.884	7.3	8.1	2.2	.3	26.7
2016	Oklahoma City	18	18	37.4	.405	.324	.829	6.9	11.0	2.6	.1	26.0
2017	Oklahoma City	5	5	38.9	.388	.265	.800	11.6	10.8	2.4	.4	**37.4**
2018	Oklahoma City	6	6	39.2	.398	.357	.825	**12.0**	7.5	1.5	.0	29.3
2019	Oklahoma City	5	5	**39.4**	.360	.324	**.885**	8.8	10.6	1.0	.6	22.8
2020	Houston	8	8	32.7	.421	.242	.532	7.0	4.6	1.5	.3	17.9
2021	Washington	5	5	37.2	.333	.250	.791	10.4	**11.8**	.4	.2	19.0
2023	L.A. Clippers	5	5	38.5	.410	.357	.880	7.6	7.4	1.2	**1.4**	23.6
2024	L.A. Clippers	6	0	19.0	.260	.235	.615	4.2	1.7	1.2	.5	6.3
2025	Denver	13	0	24.1	.391	.317	.700	3.7	2.6	.9	.1	11.7
Career		135	116	35.5	.405	.299	.820	6.7	7.1	1.7	.3	22.5

=== College ===
Year	Team	GP	GS	MPG	FG%	3P%	FT%	RPG	APG	SPG	BPG	PPG
2006–07	UCLA	36	1	9.0	.457	**.409**	.548	.8	.7	.4	.0	3.4
2007–08	UCLA	**39**	**34**	**33.8**	**.465**	.338	**.713**	**3.9**	**4.3**	**1.6**	**.2**	**12.7**
Career		75	35	21.9	.464	.354	.685	2.4	2.5	1.0	.1	8.3

== Awards and honors ==
=== NBA ===
- NBA Most Valuable Player: 2017
- 9× NBA All-Star: 2011–2013, 2015–2020
- 2× NBA All-Star Game MVP: 2015, 2016
- 9× All-NBA Selections:
  - 2× All-NBA First Team: 2016, 2017
  - 5× All-NBA Second Team: 2011–2013, 2015, 2018
  - 2× All-NBA Third Team: 2019, 2020
- 2× NBA scoring champion: 2015, 2017
- 3× NBA assists leader: 2018, 2019, 2021
- NBA All-Rookie First Team: 2009
- Season Long NBA Community Assist Award: 2014–15
- NBA 75th Anniversary Team

=== College ===
- 2008 All-Pac-10 Third Team
- 2008 Pac-10 Defensive Player of the Year
- 2008 Pac-10 All-Tournament Team
- 2008 Pac-10 All-Defensive Team
- 2008 CollegeInsider.com All-Defensive Team

=== High school ===
- First-team All-CIF Division I
- Third-team All-State
- 2× Most Valuable Player of the Bay League

== Business interests ==
=== Endorsements ===
In October 2012, Westbrook signed with the Jordan Brand. His first commercial was with the Jordan Brand and Champs in which a high school athlete purchased Jordan gear from Champs and transformed into Westbrook and won a state championship. In 2017, Westbrook signed a 10-year extension with Jordan Brand that gave him the largest total endorsement deal of any athlete sponsored by the brand.

In November 2013, Westbrook signed with Kings and Jaxs Boxer Briefs. He stated: "I have always loved fashion so working with Kings & Jaxs was a natural fit as we both have a fearless and creative approach to style." He signed with PepsiCo to become the global face of Mountain Dew Kickstart.

=== Fashion ===
In 2015, Westbrook was named Marketing Creative Director of the denim brand True Religion. In 2016, he launched the unisex streetwear brand Honor the Gift, which pays tribute to his years growing up in Hawthorne and Los Angeles.

=== Film ===
Westbrook made his production debut with Tulsa Burning: The 1921 Race Massacre about the Tulsa race massacre, which was inspired by his time playing in Oklahoma City. It received three Primetime Emmy nominations in 2021. He produced the short film Why Not? in a collaboration with Jordan Brand. He also produced his autobiographical documentary, Passion Play: Russell Westbrook, which debuted on Showtime in 2021.

== Personal life ==
Westbrook and his wife have three children: one son and twin daughters.

Westbrook wears a "KB3" wristband and has "KB3" on his sneakers in honor of his childhood friend Khelcey Barrs III. In 2012, he started the Russell Westbrook Why Not? Foundation, which promotes community-based education and family service programs while pushing the younger generation to be self-confident.

Westbrook is a minority shareholder in the Premier League soccer club Leeds United. Westbrook is also an investor in USL Championship soccer club OKC Energy.

== Publications ==
- Westbrook, Russell (2017). Russell Westbrook: Style Drivers. Rizzoli. ISBN 978-0-8478-5993-1.

== See also ==
- List of NBA career scoring leaders
- List of NBA career assists leaders
- List of NBA career steals leaders
- List of NBA career turnovers leaders
- List of NBA career minutes played leaders
- List of NBA career games played leaders
- List of NBA career triple-double leaders
- List of NBA career playoff assists leaders
- List of NBA career playoff triple-double leaders
- List of NBA career playoff turnovers leaders
- List of NBA single-game playoff scoring leaders
- List of NBA franchise career scoring leaders
