= Robert John Jenkins Jr. =

American computer professional (born 1966)

Robert John Jenkins Junior (born 1966 in Akron, Ohio), also known as Bob Jenkins, is an American computer professional and author of several fast pseudorandom number generators such as ISAAC and hash functions (Jenkins hash)
