= Landon Curt Noll =

American computer scientist (born 1960)

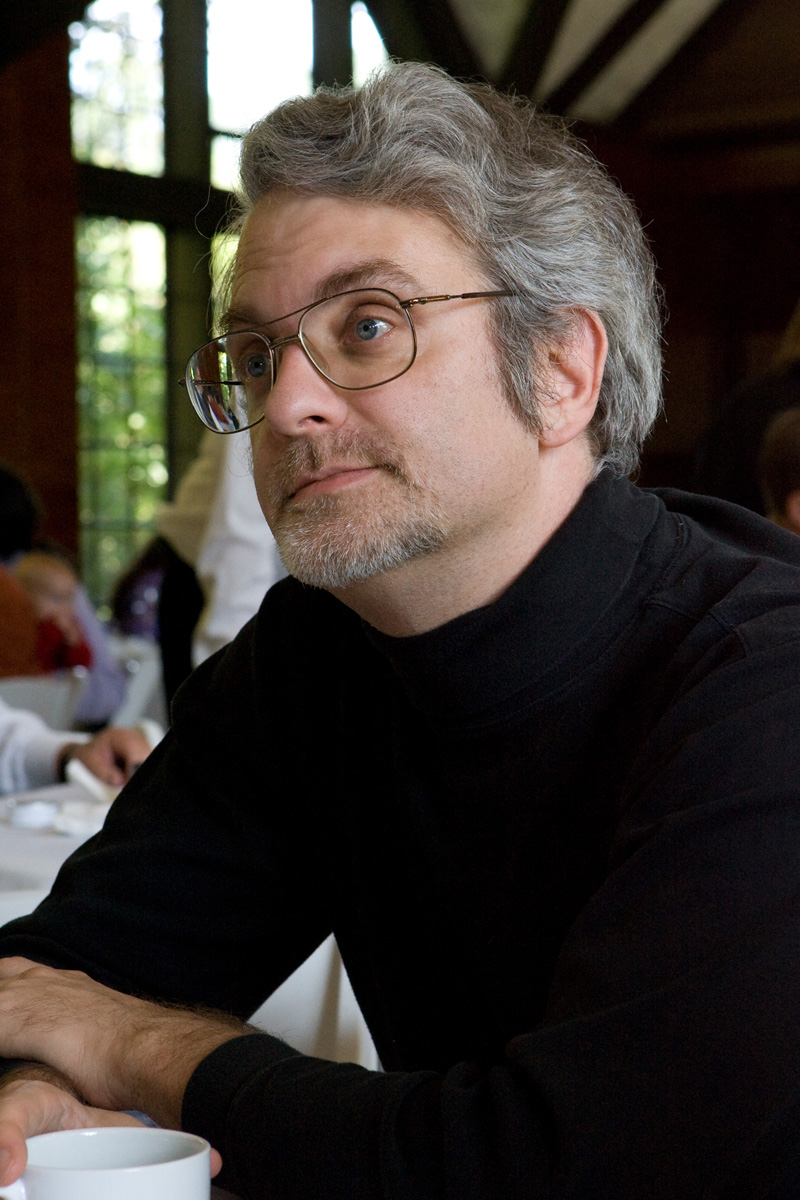
- Noll in 2007
- Born: October 28, 1960 (age 65); Walnut Creek, California, United States
- Other names: chongo, Lord Ogden
- Education: California State University, East Bay and Linfield University
- Known for: International Obfuscated C Code Contest; Fowler Noll Vo hash Lavarand; Prime number Vulcanoid asteroid Names of large numbers
- Awards: USENIX Lifetime Achievement Award (contributor - 1993)
- Scientific career
- Fields: Mathematics and Cryptography and Astronomy
- Workplaces: Lawrence Livermore National Laboratory and Fremont Peak Observatory

Notes
- Held or co-held 8 World records relating to large prime numbers. Common username: chongo

Landon Curt Noll (born October 28, 1960) is an American computer scientist, co-discoverer of the 25th Mersenne prime and discoverer of the 26th, which he found while still enrolled at Hayward High School and concurrently at California State University, Hayward.

== Biography ==
Noll was born in Walnut Creek, California, United States. At age 18, he became the youngest person to break the record for the largest known prime. He has held or co-held the record three times. He is also the co-inventor (with John Horton Conway) of a system for naming arbitrarily large powers of 10. He also helped start the International Obfuscated C Code Contest, and is a co-inventor of the Fowler Noll Vo hash function.

He was also a member of the Amdahl Six team (John S. Brown, Bodo Parady, Curt Landon Noll, Gene W. Smith, Joel F. Smith, and Sergio E. Zarantonello) which discovered another record prime in 1989; this prime remains unusual as a record large prime as it was not a Mersenne prime.

Noll is an amateur astronomer. His work includes measuring the Solar parallax during the 2004 Transit of Venus as well as the search for Vulcanoid asteroids.

He was also involved in politics as a Sunnyvale, California city council member and vice-mayor.
