= Fowler–Noll–Vo hash function =

Non-cryptographic hash function

Fowler–Noll–Vo (or FNV) is a non-cryptographic hash function created by Glenn Fowler, Landon Curt Noll, and Kiem-Phong Vo.

The basis of the FNV hash algorithm was taken from an idea sent as reviewer comments to the IEEE POSIX P1003.2 committee by Glenn Fowler and Phong Vo in 1991. In a subsequent ballot round, Landon Curt Noll improved on their algorithm. In an email message to Noll, they named it the Fowler/Noll/Vo or FNV hash.

== Overview ==
The current versions are FNV-1 and FNV-1a, which supply a means of creating non-zero FNV offset basis. FNV currently comes in 32-, 64-, 128-, 256-, 512-, and 1024-bit variants. For pure FNV implementations, this is determined solely by the availability of FNV primes for the desired bit length; however, the FNV webpage discusses methods of adapting one of the above versions to a smaller length that may or may not be a power of two.

The FNV hash algorithms and reference FNV source code have been released into the public domain.

The Python programming language previously used a modified version of the FNV scheme for its default hash function. From Python 3.4, FNV has been replaced with SipHash to resist "hash flooding" denial-of-service attacks.

FNV is not a cryptographic hash.

== The hash ==
One of FNV's key advantages is that it is very simple to implement. Start with an initial hash value of FNV offset basis. For each byte in the input, multiply hash by the FNV prime, then XOR it with the byte from the input. The alternate algorithm, FNV-1a, reverses the multiply and XOR steps.

=== FNV-1 hash ===
The FNV-1 hash algorithm is as follows:

algorithm fnv-1 is
    hash := FNV_offset_basis

    for each byte_of_data to be hashed do
        hash := hash × FNV_prime
        hash := hash XOR byte_of_data

    return hash

In the above pseudocode, all variables are unsigned integers. All variables, except for byte_of_data, have the same number of bits as the FNV hash. The variable, byte_of_data, is an 8-bit unsigned integer.

As an example, consider the 64-bit FNV-1 hash:

- All variables, except for byte_of_data, are 64-bit unsigned integers.
- The variable, byte_of_data, is an 8-bit unsigned integer.
- The FNV_offset_basis is the 64-bit value: 14695981039346656037 (in hex, 0xcbf29ce484222325).
- The FNV_prime is the 64-bit value 1099511628211 (in hex, 0x100000001b3).
- The multiply returns the lower 64 bits of the product.
- The XOR is an 8-bit operation that modifies only the lower 8-bits of the hash value.
- The hash value returned is a 64-bit unsigned integer.

=== FNV-1a hash ===
The FNV-1a hash differs from the FNV-1 hash only by the order in which the multiply and XOR is performed:

algorithm fnv-1a is
    hash := FNV_offset_basis

    for each byte_of_data to be hashed do
        hash := hash XOR byte_of_data
        hash := hash × FNV_prime

    return hash

The above pseudocode has the same assumptions that were noted for the FNV-1 pseudocode. The change in order leads to slightly better avalanche characteristics.

=== FNV-0 hash (deprecated) ===
The FNV-0 hash differs from the FNV-1 hash only by the initialisation value of the hash variable:

algorithm fnv-0 is
    hash := 0

    for each byte_of_data to be hashed do
        hash := hash × FNV_prime
        hash := hash XOR byte_of_data

    return hash

The above pseudocode has the same assumptions that were noted for the FNV-1 pseudocode.

A consequence of the initialisation of the hash to 0 is that empty messages and all messages consisting of only the byte 0, regardless of their length, hash to 0.

Use of the FNV-0 hash is deprecated except for the computing of the FNV offset basis for use as the FNV-1 and FNV-1a hash parameters.

=== FNV offset basis ===
There are several different FNV offset bases for various bit lengths. These offset bases are computed by computing the FNV-0 from the following 32 octets when expressed in ASCII:

chongo <Landon Curt Noll> /\../\

This is one of Landon Curt Noll's signature lines. This is the only current practical use for the deprecated FNV-0.

=== FNV prime ===
An FNV prime is a prime number and is determined as follows:

For a given integer s such that 4 < s < 11, let n = 2^{s} and t = ⌊(5 + n) / 12⌋; then the n-bit FNV prime is the smallest prime number p that is of the form

$$256^t + 2^8 + \mathrm{b}\,$$

such that:

- 0 < b < 2^{8},
- the number of one-bits in the binary representation of b is either 4 or 5, and
- p mod (2^{40} − 2^{24} − 1) > 2^{24} + 2^{8} + 2^{7}.

Experimentally, FNV primes matching the above constraints tend to have better dispersion properties. They improve the polynomial feedback characteristic when an FNV prime multiplies an intermediate hash value. As such, the hash values produced are more scattered throughout the n-bit hash space.

=== FNV hash parameters ===
The above FNV prime constraints and the definition of the FNV offset basis yield the following table of FNV hash parameters:

FNV parameters
Size in bits $n = 2^s$	Representation	FNV prime	FNV offset basis
32	Expression	2^{24} + 2^{8} + 0x93	
32	Decimal	16777619	2166136261
32	Hexadecimal	0x01000193	0x811c9dc5
64	Expression	2^{40} + 2^{8} + 0xb3	
64	Decimal	1099511628211	14695981039346656037
64	Hexadecimal	0x00000100000001b3	0xcbf29ce484222325
128	Representation	2^{88} + 2^{8} + 0x3b	
128	Decimal	309485009821345068724781371	144066263297769815596495629667062367629
128	Hexadecimal	0x0000000001000000000000000000013b	0x6c62272e07bb014262b821756295c58d
256	Representation	2^{168} + 2^{8} + 0x63	
256	Decimal	374144419156711147060143317; 175368453031918731002211	100029257958052580907070968620625704837; 092796014241193945225284501741471925557
256	Hexadecimal	0x00000000000000000000010000000000 00000000000000000000000000000163	0xdd268dbcaac550362d98c384c4e576ccc8b153 6847b6bbb31023b4c8caee0535
512	Representation	2^{344} + 2^{8} + 0x57	
512	Decimal	358359158748448673689190764; 890951084499463279557543925; 583998256154206699388825751; 26094039892345713852759	965930312949666949800943540071631046609; 041874567263789610837432943446265799458; 293219771643844981305189220653980578449; 5328239340083876191928701583869517785
512	Hexadecimal	0x0000000000000000 0000000000000000; 0000000001000000 0000000000000000; 0000000000000000 0000000000000000; 0000000000000000 0000000000000157	0xb86db0b1171f4416 dca1e50f309990ac ac87d059c9000000 0000000000000d21 e948f68a34c192f6 2ea79bc942dbe7ce 182036415f56e34b ac982aac4afe9fd9
1024	Representation	2^{680} + 2^{8} + 0x8d	
1024	Decimal	501645651011311865543459881103; 527895503076534540479074430301; 752383111205510814745150915769; 222029538271616265187852689524; 938529229181652437508374669137; 180409427187316048473796672026; 0389217684476157468082573	14197795064947621068722070641403218320; 88062279544193396087847491461758272325; 22967323037177221508640965212023555493; 65628174669108571814760471015076148029; 75596980407732015769245856300321530495; 71501574036444603635505054127112859663; 61610267868082893823963790439336411086; 884584107735010676915
1024	Hexadecimal	0x0000000000000000 0000000000000000; 0000000000000000 0000000000000000; 0000000000000000 0000010000000000; 0000000000000000 0000000000000000; 0000000000000000 0000000000000000; 0000000000000000 0000000000000000; 0000000000000000 0000000000000000; 0000000000000000 000000000000018d	0x0000000000000000 005f7a76758ecc4d 32e56d5a591028b7 4b29fc4223fdada1 6c3bf34eda3674da 9a21d90000000000 0000000000000000 0000000000000000; 0000000000000000 0000000000000000; 0000000000000000 000000000004c6d7 eb6e73802734510a 555f256cc005ae55 6bde8cc9c6a93b21 aff4b16c71ee90b3

== Non-cryptographic hash ==
The FNV hash was designed for fast hash table and checksum use, not cryptography. The authors have identified the following properties as making the algorithm unsuitable as a cryptographic hash function:

- Speed of computation – As a hash designed primarily for hashtable and checksum use, FNV-1 and FNV-1a were designed to be fast to compute. However, this same speed makes finding specific hash values (collisions) by brute force faster.
- Sticky state – Being an iterative hash based primarily on multiplication and XOR, the algorithm is sensitive to the number zero. Specifically, if the hash value were to become zero at any point during calculation, and the next byte hashed were also all zeroes, then the hash would not change. This makes colliding messages trivial to create given a message that results in a hash value of zero at some point in its calculation. Additional operations, such as the addition of a third constant prime on each step, can mitigate this but may have detrimental effects on avalanche effect or random distribution of hash values.
- Diffusion – The ideal secure hash function is one in which each byte of input has an equally-complex effect on every bit of the hash. In the FNV hash, the ones place (the rightmost bit) is always the XOR of the rightmost bit of every input byte. This can be mitigated by XOR-folding (computing a hash twice the desired length, and then XORing the bits in the "upper half" with the bits in the "lower half").

A structural weakness of FNV-1a arises from its use of XOR before multiplication, which can cause predictable relationships between hashes of related inputs. For example, the following identity holds in both the 32-bit and 64-bit variants:

fnv1a("some-string-a") XOR fnv1a("some-id-1231") = fnv1a("some-string-b") XOR fnv1a("some-id-1232")

because the differing characters ('a' vs 'b', and '1' vs '2') differ by the same bit pattern. This illustrates how certain bitwise symmetries in input can lead to unintended hash correlations. XOR-folding does not remove this weakness.

== See also ==
- Bloom filter (application for fast hashes)
- Non-cryptographic hash functions
