= Spectral Hash =

Cryptographic hash function

Spectral Hash is a cryptographic hash function submitted to the NIST hash function competition by Gokay Saldamlı, Cevahir Demirkıran, Megan Maguire, Carl Minden, Jacob Topper, Alex Troesch, Cody Walker, Çetin Kaya Koç. It uses a Merkle–Damgård construction and employs several mathematical structures including finite fields and discrete Fourier transforms. The authors claim 512-bit hashes at 51.2 gigabits per second on a 100-MHz Virtex-4 FPGA.

Spectral hash is insecure; a method exists to generate arbitrary collisions in the hash state, and therefore in the final hash digest.

== See also ==
- BLAKE
- Grøstl (Knudsen et al.)
- JH
- Keccak (Keccak team, Daemen et al.)
- Skein (Schneier et al.)
