= HAIFA construction =

Design method for cryptographic hash functions

The HAIFA construction (hash iterative framework) is a cryptographic structure used in the design of hash functions. It is one of the modern alternatives to the Merkle–Damgård construction, avoiding its weaknesses like length extension attacks. The construction was designed by Eli Biham and Orr Dunkelman in 2007.

Three of the 14 second round candidates in the NIST hash function competition were based on HAIFA constructions (BLAKE, SHAvite-3, ECHO). Other hash functions based on it are LAKE, Sarmal, SWIFFTX and HNF-256. The construction of Skein (Unique Block Iteration) is similar to HAIFA. Another alternative construction is the sponge construction.
