= Dmitry Khovratovich =

Cryptographer

- Education: Moscow State University
- Occupation: cryptographer
- Known for: Equihash, Argon2

Dmitry Khovratovich is a Russian cryptographer, currently a Lead Cryptographer for the Dusk Network, researcher for the Ethereum Foundation, and member of the International Association for Cryptologic Research.

== Biography ==
Khovratovich, together with Alex Biryukov, developed the Equihash proof-of-work algorithm which is currently being used as consensus mechanism for the Zcash cryptocurrency, and the Argon2 key derivation function, which won the Password Hashing Competition in July 2015. He is the publisher of several cryptanalysis papers for a number of mainstream cyphers, such as the first cryptanalytic attack on full-round AES-192 and AES-256 which is faster than a brute-force attack, an attack on the RadioGatún cryptographic primitive, and also the current best cryptanalysis on Skein, a candidate for the SHA-3 competition.

In 2014, he published a research about the deanonymisation of clients in the Bitcoin P2P network

== Selected publications ==
- Egalitarian computing, USENIX 2016, with Alex Biryukov
- Argon2: new generation of memory-hard functions for password hashing and other applications, Euro S&P 2016, with Alex Biryukov and Daniel Dinu
- Equihash: Asymmetric Proof-of-Work Based on the Generalized Birthday Problem, NDSS 2016, with Alex Biryukov
- Tradeoff Cryptanalysis of Memory-Hard Functions, Asiacrypt 2015, with Alex Biryukov
- Rotational Cryptanalysis of ARX Revisited, FSE 2015, with Ivica Nikolic, Josef Pieprzyk, Przemyslaw Sokolowski, Ron Steinfeld
- Cryptographic Schemes Based on the ASASA Structure: Black-Box, White-Box, and Public-Key, Asiacrypt 2014, with Alex Biryukov and Charles Bouillaguet
- Deanonymisation of Clients in Bitcoin P2P Network, ACM CCS 2014 with Alex Biryukov and Ivan Pustogarov
- Collision Spectrum, Entropy Loss, T-Sponges, and Cryptanalysis of GLUON-64, FSE 2014, with Leo Perrin
- PAEQ: Parallelizable Permutation-Based Authenticated Encryption, ISC 2014, with Alex Biryukov
- Key Wrapping with a Fixed Permutation, CT-RSA 2014.
- Bicliques for Permutations: Collision and Preimage Attacks in Stronger Settings, Asiacrypt'12, 2012
- New Preimage Attacks against Reduced SHA-1, Crypto'12, 2012. With Simon Knellwolf
- Narrow-Bicliques: Cryptanalysis of the Full IDEA, Eurocrypt'12, 2012. With Gaetan Leurent and Christian Rechberger
- Bicliques for Preimages: Attacks on Skein-512 and the SHA-2 Family, FSE'12, 2012. With Christian Rechberger and Alexandra Savelieva
- Biclique Cryptanalysis of the Full AES, Asiacrypt'11, 2011. With Andrey Bogdanov and Christian Rechberger
- Rotational Rebound Attacks on Reduced Skein, Asiacrypt'10, 2010. With Ivica Nikolic and Christian Rechberger
- Rotational Cryptanalysis of ARX, FSE'10, 2010. With Ivica Nikolic
- Key Recovery Attacks of Practical Complexity on AES Variants With Up To 10 Rounds. With Alex Biryukov, Orr Dunkelman, Nathan Keller, and Adi Shamir
- Related-Key Attack on the Full AES-192 and AES-256. With Alex Biryukov
- Meet-in-the-Middle Attacks on SHA-3 Candidates. FSE'2009. With Ralf-Philipp Weinmann and Ivica Nikolić

== Awards ==
- Winner of LuxBlockHackathon 2017
- Best Paper Award Asiacrypt 2010
- Best PhD Thesis, University of Luxembourg (2012)
