= SIMD (hash function) =

Cryptographic hash function

SIMD is a cryptographic hash function based on the Merkle–Damgård construction submitted to the NIST hash function competition by Gaëtan Leurent. It is one of fourteen entries to be accepted into round two of the competition, but was not shortlisted for the third and final round.

The designer states that the "most important component of SIMD is its message expansion, which is designed to give a high minimal distance". The algorithm's speed is claimed to be 11–13 cycles per byte.
