= Lane (hash function) =

Cryptographic hash function

Lane is a cryptographic hash function submitted to the NIST hash function competition; it was designed by Sebastiaan Indesteege with contributions by Elena Andreeva, Christophe De Cannière, Orr Dunkelman, Emilia Käsper, Svetla Nikova, Bart Preneel and Elmar Tischhauser. It re-uses many components from AES in a custom construction. The authors claim performance of up to 25.66 cycles per byte on an Intel Core 2 Duo.
