= Nasha =

Nasha may refer to:

- Nasha (film), 2013 Indian film
- Nasha (2015 film), 2015 Pakistani film
- NaSHA, a hash function
- "Nasha" a song by Pritam and Alisha Chinai from the 2006 Indian film Naksha

== People with the name ==
- Margaret Nasha, a politician from Botswana
- Nasha Aziz, Malaysian actor and model

== See also ==
- Nasha Niva, Belarusian newspaper
- Nasha Slova, Belarusian newspaper
- Nasha Russia, Russian sketch show
- Pehla Nasha, 1993 Indian film by Ashutosh Gowariker
- Naya Nasha, 1973 Indian film
- Halka Nasha, ghazal album by Indian singer Hariharan
