= Bitcoin Gold =

Hard cryptocurrency fork of bitcoin

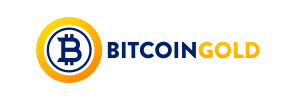

Denominations
- Code: BTG
- Precision: 10^{−8}
- Subunits
- 1/1000: millibitcoin
- 1/100000000: satoshi

Development
- Initial release: 0.15.0.1 / 12 November 2017 (9 years ago)
- Latest release: 0.17.3 / 3 August 2020 (6 years ago)
- Code repository: github.com/BTCGPU/BTCGPU
- Development status: Active
- Project fork of: Bitcoin
- Written in: C++, Qt
- Operating system: Windows, OS X, Linux
- Source model: Open source
- License: MIT License

Ledger
- Ledger start: 3 January 2009 (17 years ago)
- Split from: Bitcoin
- Timestamping scheme: Proof-of-work
- Hash function: Equihash
- Block reward: 3.125 BTG, halved April 24, 2024, at block no. 840 000. Will halve again at block no. 1 050 000 (~spring of 2028).
- Block time: 10 minutes
- Block explorer: BitcoinGold Explorer
- Supply limit: 21,000,000 BTG

Website
- Website: btgofficial.org

Bitcoin Gold (BTG) is a cryptocurrency which was created as a hard fork of bitcoin.

The stated purpose of the hard fork is to make mining on commonly available graphics cards economically viable. The cryptocurrency has been hit by two 51% hashing attacks, once in 2018 and once in 2020.

== History ==
Bitcoin Gold hard forked from the bitcoin blockchain on October 24, 2017. The stated purpose of the hard fork was to change the proof of work algorithm so that ASICs (Application-Specific Integrated Circuits) which are used to mine bitcoin cannot be used to mine the Bitcoin Gold blockchain in the hopes that enabling mining on commonly available graphics cards would allow mining from a home PC.

According to Mashable the launch was criticized for being hastily put together and for including a developer pre-mine. Shortly after launch, the project's website came under a distributed denial of service attack.

In May 2018, Bitcoin Gold was hit by a 51% hashing attack by an unknown actor. This type of attack makes it possible to manipulate the blockchain ledger on which transactions are recorded, and to spend the same digital coins more than once. During the attack, 388,000 BTG (worth approximately US$18 million) was stolen from several cryptocurrency exchanges. Bitcoin Gold was later delisted from Bittrex, after the team refused to help pay some damages.

In July 2018, Bitcoin Gold changed mining algorithm to one that requires more memory to further discourage ASIC mining.

Bitcoin Gold suffered from 51% attacks again in January 2020. In July 2020, the version 0.17.2 was released as an emergency update in order to elude a long attack chain originated a few days before.
