= NaSHA =

NaSHA is a hash function accepted as a first round SHA-3 candidate for the NIST hash function competition.

NaSHA was designed by Smile Markovski and Aleksandra Mileva with contributions by Simona Samardziski (programmer) and Boro Jakimovski (programmer). NaSHA supports internal state sizes of 1024 and 2048 bits, and arbitrary output sizes between 125 and 512 bits. It uses quasigroup string transformations with quasigroups of order 2^{64}, defined by extended Feistel networks. The quasigroups used in every iteration of the compression function are different and depend on the processed message block.

The authors claim performance of up to 23.06 cycles per byte on an Intel Core 2 Duo in 64-bit mode.

Cryptanalysis during the SHA-3 competition has indicated that 384/512 version of NaSHA is susceptible to collision attacks, but the authors disputed those attacks and also included small changes to achieve the strength of 224/256 version.
