= EnRUPT =

Cryptographic algorithm

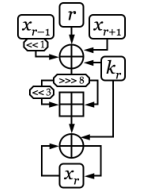
- One round of EnRUPT

General
- First published: 2008
- Derived from: Corrected Block TEA

Cipher detail
- Key sizes: variable
- Block sizes: arbitrary, at least two words (64 bits)
- Structure: Unbalanced Feistel Network
- Rounds: 8 * (plaintext words) + 4 * (key words)

Best public cryptanalysis
- 2^{480} complexity meet-in-the-middle preimage attack against EnRUPT hash, collision attack with 2^{40} time complexity Chosen plaintext attack with 2^{15} queries against EnRUPT block cipher

EnRUPT is a block cipher and a family of cryptographic algorithms based on XXTEA. EnRUPT hash function was submitted to SHA-3 competition but it wasn't selected to the second round.
