= Alex Biryukov =

Israeli computer scientist, cryptographer

- אלכס ביריוקוב
- Known for: Design of the LEX stream cipher, cryptanalysis of AES, development of Argon2 key derivation function, impossible differential cryptanalysis, slide attack
- Scientific career
- Fields: Cryptography
- Institutions: University of Luxembourg

Alex Biryukov (Hebrew: אלכס ביריוקוב) is a cryptographer, currently a full professor at the University of Luxembourg.

== Biography ==
His notable work includes the design of the stream cipher LEX, as well as the cryptanalysis of numerous cryptographic primitives. In 1998, he developed impossible differential cryptanalysis together with Eli Biham and Adi Shamir. In 1999, he developed the slide attack together with David Wagner. In 2009 he developed, together with Dmitry Khovratovich, the first cryptanalytic attack on full-round AES-192 and AES-256 that is faster than a brute-force attack. In 2015 he developed the Argon2 key derivation function with Daniel Dinu and Dmitry Khovratovich. Since 1994 Alex Biryukov is a member of the International Association for Cryptologic Research.
