= Skein (hash function) =

Cryptographic hash function

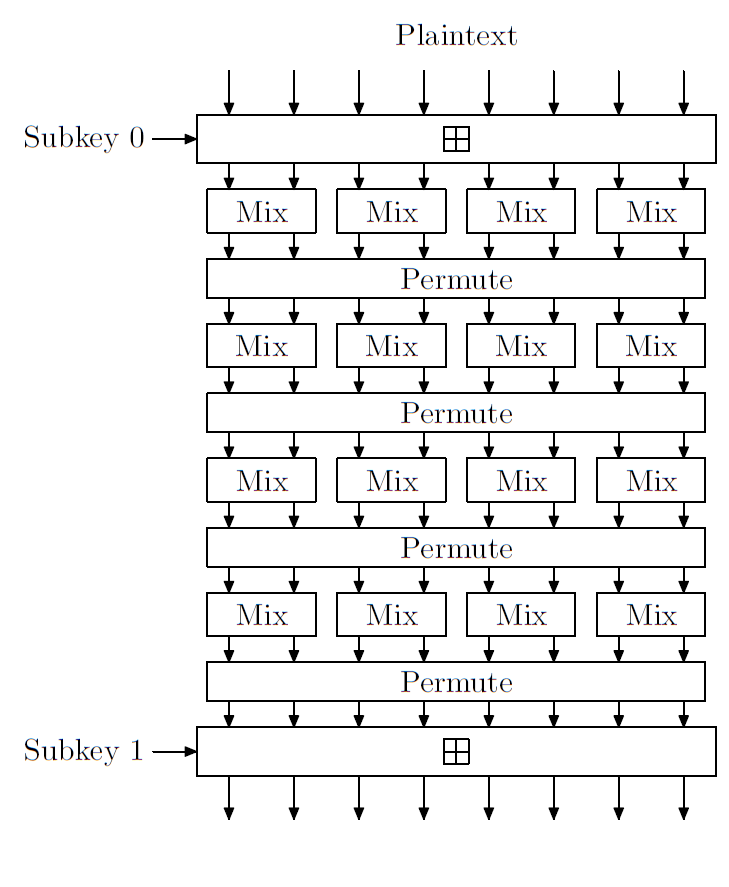

General
- Designers: Bruce Schneier, Niels Ferguson, et al.
- Derived from: Threefish
- Certification: SHA-3 finalist

Detail
- Digest sizes: arbitrary
- Structure: Unique Block Iteration
- Rounds: 72 (256 & 512 block size), 80 (1024 block size)
- Speed: 6.1 cpb on Core 2.

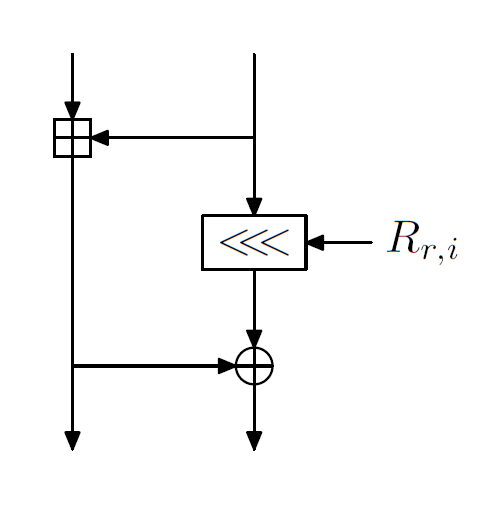
Threefish Mix Function

Skein is a cryptographic hash function and one of five finalists in the NIST hash function competition. Entered as a candidate to become the SHA-3 standard, the successor of SHA-1 and SHA-2, it ultimately lost to NIST hash candidate Keccak.

The name Skein refers to how the Skein function intertwines the input, similar to a skein of yarn. Skein was designed to natively support arbitrary, variable-length outputs, so it can be considered an extendable-output function (XOF).

== History ==
Skein was created by Bruce Schneier, Niels Ferguson, Stefan Lucks, Doug Whiting, Mihir Bellare, Tadayoshi Kohno, Jon Callas and Jesse Walker.

Skein is based on the Threefish tweakable block cipher compressed using Unique Block Iteration (UBI) chaining mode, a variant of the Matyas–Meyer–Oseas hash mode, while leveraging an optional low-overhead argument-system for flexibility.

Skein's algorithm and a reference implementation was given to public domain.

== Functionality ==
Skein supports internal state sizes of 256, 512 and 1024 bits, and arbitrary output sizes.

The authors claim 6.1 cycles per byte for any output size on an Intel Core 2 Duo in 64-bit mode.

The core of Threefish is based on a MIX function that transforms 2 64-bit words using a single addition, rotation by a constant and XOR. The UBI chaining mode combines an input chaining value with an arbitrary length input string and produces a fixed size output.

Threefish's nonlinearity comes entirely from the combination of addition operations and exclusive-ORs; it does not use S-boxes. The function is optimized for 64-bit processors, and the Skein paper defines optional features such as randomized hashing, parallelizable tree hashing, a stream cipher, personalization, and a key derivation function.

== Cryptanalysis ==
In October 2010, an attack that combines rotational cryptanalysis with the rebound attack was published. The attack finds rotational collisions for 53 of 72 rounds in Threefish-256, and 57 of 72 rounds in Threefish-512. It also affects the Skein hash function. This is a follow-up to the earlier attack published in February, which breaks 39 and 42 rounds respectively.

The Skein team tweaked the key schedule constant for round 3 of the NIST hash function competition, to make this attack less effective, even though they believe the hash would still be secure without these tweaks.

== Examples of Skein hashes ==
Hash values of empty string.

Skein-256-256("")
c8877087da56e072870daa843f176e9453115929094c3a40c463a196c29bf7ba
Skein-512-256("")
39ccc4554a8b31853b9de7a1fe638a24cce6b35a55f2431009e18780335d2621
Skein-512-512("")
bc5b4c50925519c290cc634277ae3d6257212395cba733bbad37a4af0fa06af41fca7903d06564fea7a2d3730dbdb80c1f85562dfcc070334ea4d1d9e72cba7a

Even a small change in the message will (with overwhelming probability) result in a mostly different hash, due to the avalanche effect. For example, adding a period to the end of the sentence:

Skein-512-256("The quick brown fox jumps over the lazy dog")
b3250457e05d3060b1a4bbc1428bc75a3f525ca389aeab96cfa34638d96e492a
Skein-512-256("The quick brown fox jumps over the lazy dog.")
41e829d7fca71c7d7154ed8fc8a069f274dd664ae0ed29d365d919f4e575eebb
Skein-512-512("The quick brown fox jumps over the lazy dog")
94c2ae036dba8783d0b3f7d6cc111ff810702f5c77707999be7e1c9486ff238a7044de734293147359b4ac7e1d09cd247c351d69826b78dcddd951f0ef912713
Skein-512-512("The quick brown fox jumps over the lazy dog.")
658223cb3d69b5e76e3588ca63feffba0dc2ead38a95d0650564f2a39da8e83fbb42c9d6ad9e03fbfde8a25a880357d457dbd6f74cbcb5e728979577dbce5436
