= Orr Dunkelman =

Israeli cryptographer and cryptanalyst

- אור דונקלמן
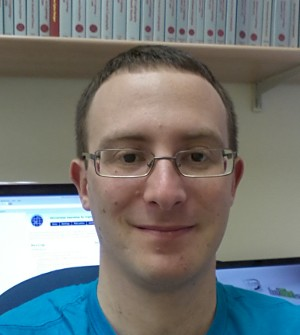
- Born: 1980 (age 45–46)
- Education: Technion - Israel Institute of Technology
- Known for: Studies in cryptography and cryptanalysis (invention and breaking of encryption functions)
- Awards: Krill Prize (2014)
- Scientific career
- Fields: Computer science, cryptography, cryptanalysis
- Workplaces: University of Haifa
- Doctoral advisor: Eli Biham

Orr Dunkelman (Hebrew: אור דונקלמן) is an Israeli cryptographer and cryptanalyst, currently a professor at the University of Haifa Computer Science department. Dunkelman is a co-director of the Center for Cyber Law & Privacy at the University of Haifa and a co-founder of Privacy Israel, an Israeli NGO for promoting privacy in Israel.

== Biography ==
Dunkelman received all his degrees at the Technion - Israel Institute of Technology. He received his Ph.D. degree at the age of 25, under the supervision of Eli Biham. Before joining the University of Haifa, Dunkelman held post-doctoral positions at KU Leuven, at École normale supérieure, and at the Weizmann Institute of Science.

== Contributions to cryptanalysis ==
Among his contributions to cryptanalysis are:

- Dissection attack – joint work with Itai Dinur, Nathan Keller, and Adi Shamir, recipient of the Best Paper Award at the Crypto 2012 conference.
- Rectangle attack – joint work with Eli Biham and Nathan Keller.
- New variants of differential-linear, boomerang, and slide attacks – joint works with Eli Biham, Adi Shamir, and other co-authors.
- Breaking (together with Eli Biham, Sebastiaan Indesteege, Nathan Keller, and Bart Preneel) KeeLoq – a block cipher used in remote keyless entry systems by multiple companies.
- Devising (jointly with Eli Biham) a practical attack on A5/1 – the cipher used in GSM security mechanisms.
- Attacking reduced-round variants of many block ciphers, including AES, Serpent, IDEA, GOST, DES, KASUMI, MISTY1, Camellia, Skipjack and others (in joint works with various coauthors).

=== New cryptographic primitives ===
Dunkelman has taken part in the design of several new cryptographic primitives:

- HAIFA construction (with Eli Biham) – a cryptographic structure used in the design of hash functions.
- KATAN and KTANTAN (with Cristophe De Canniere and Miroslav Knežević) - a family of small and efficient hardware-oriented block ciphers.
- SHAvite-3 (with Eli Biham), a hash function which was one of the 14 semifinalists in the NIST hash function competition.

== Awards and honors ==
Dunkelman received the Krill Prize from the Wolf Foundation in 2014, and papers he co-authored won the Best Paper Award at the Crypto conference (2012) and at the Fast Software Encryption (FSE) conference (2012).
