= Grøstl =

Cryptographic hash function

General
- Designers: Praveen Gauravaram, Lars Knudsen, Krystian Matusiewicz, Florian Mendel, Christian Rechberger, Martin Schläffer, and Søren S. Thomsen
- Related to: AES
- Certification: SHA-3 finalist

Detail
- Digest sizes: arbitrary (from 8 to 512 bits in 8-bit steps)
- Rounds: 10 (digest size 8-256) or 14 (digest size 264-512)
- Speed: 21.4 cpb on Core 2 for 224/256 bit digest; 30.1 cpb for 384/512 bit digest.

Best public cryptanalysis

Grøstl is a cryptographic hash function submitted to the NIST hash function competition by Praveen Gauravaram, Lars Knudsen, Krystian Matusiewicz, Florian Mendel, Christian Rechberger, Martin Schläffer, and Søren S. Thomsen. Grøstl was chosen as one of the five finalists of the competition. It uses the same S-box as AES in a custom construction. The authors claim speeds of up to 21.4 cycles per byte on an Intel Core 2 Duo, and 9.6 cycles/byte on an Intel i7 with AES-NI.

According to the submission document, the name "Grøstl" is a multilingual play-on-words, referring to an Austrian dish that is very similar to hash (food).

Like other hash functions in the MD5/SHA family, Grøstl divides the input into blocks and iteratively computes h_{i} = f(h_{i−1}, m_{i}). However, Grøstl maintains a hash state at least twice the size of the final output (512 or 1024 bits), which is only truncated at the end of hash computation.

The compression function f is based on a pair of 512- or 1024-bit permutation functions P and Q, and is defined as:

f(h, m) = P(h ⊕ m) ⊕ Q(m) ⊕ h

The permutation functions P and Q are heavily based on the Rijndael (AES) block cipher, but operate on 8×8 or 8×16 arrays of bytes, rather than 4×4. Like AES, each round consists of four operations:

1. AddRoundKey (the Grøstl round keys are fixed, but differ between P and Q)
2. SubBytes (this uses the Rijndael S-box, allowing sharing with AES implementations)
3. ShiftBytes (expanded compared to AES, this also differs between P and Q, and 512- and 1024-bit versions)
4. MixColumns (using an 8×8 matrix rather than Rijndael's 4×4)

Unlike Rijndael, all rounds are identical and there is no final AddRoundKey operation. 10 rounds are recommended for the 512-bit permutation, and 14 rounds for the 1024-bit version.

The final double-width hash receives a final output transformation of

Ω(h) = h ⊕ P(h)

and is then truncated to the desired width. This is equivalent to applying a final iteration of the compression function using an all-zero message block m, followed by a (cryptographically insignificant) exclusive-or with the fixed constant Q(0).

== Examples of Grøstl hashes ==
Hash values of empty string.

Grøstl-224("")
0x f2e180fb5947be964cd584e22e496242c6a329c577fc4ce8c36d34c3
Grøstl-256("")
0x 1a52d11d550039be16107f9c58db9ebcc417f16f736adb2502567119f0083467
Grøstl-384("")
0x ac353c1095ace21439251007862d6c62f829ddbe6de4f78e68d310a9205a736d8b11d99bffe448f57a1cfa2934f044a5
Grøstl-512("")
0x 6d3ad29d279110eef3adbd66de2a0345a77baede1557f5d099fce0c03d6dc2ba8e6d4a6633dfbd66053c20faa87d1a11f39a7fbe4a6c2f009801370308fc4ad8

Even a small change in the message will (with overwhelming probability) result in a mostly different hash, due to the avalanche effect. For example, adding a period to the end of the sentence:

Grøstl-256("The quick brown fox jumps over the lazy dog")
0x 8c7ad62eb26a21297bc39c2d7293b4bd4d3399fa8afab29e970471739e28b301
Grøstl-256("The quick brown fox jumps over the lazy dog.")
0x f48290b1bcacee406a0429b993adb8fb3d065f4b09cbcdb464a631d4a0080aaf
