= Encryption software =

Software that uses cryptography

Encryption software is software that uses cryptography to prevent unauthorized access to digital information. Cryptography is used to protect digital information stored on computers as well as information transmitted over computer networks such as the Internet.

== Classification ==
Many software products provide encryption. Encryption software uses a cipher to transform plaintext into ciphertext. One way to classify this type of software is the type of cipher used. Ciphers can be divided into two categories: public key ciphers (also known as asymmetric ciphers), and symmetric key ciphers. Encryption software can be based on either public key or symmetric key encryption.

Another way to classify software encryption is to categorize its purpose. Using this approach, software encryption may be classified into software which encrypts "data in transit" and software which encrypts "data at rest". Data in transit generally uses public key ciphers, and data at rest generally uses symmetric key ciphers.

Symmetric key ciphers can be further divided into stream ciphers and block ciphers. Stream ciphers typically encrypt plaintext a bit or byte at a time, and are most commonly used to encrypt real-time communications, such as audio and video information. The key is used to establish the initial state of a keystream generator, and the output of that generator is used to encrypt the plaintext. Block cipher algorithms split the plaintext into fixed-size blocks and encrypt one block at a time. For example, AES processes 16-byte blocks, while its predecessor DES encrypted blocks of eight bytes.

== Data in transit ==
Data in transit is data that is being sent over a computer network. When the data is between two endpoints, any confidential information may be vulnerable. The payload (confidential information) can be encrypted to secure its confidentiality, as well as its integrity and validity.

Often, the data in transit is between two entities that do not know each other - such as in the case of visiting a website. To establish trust and securely share encryption keys between parties, a framework of roles, policies, and procedures known as the public key infrastructure (PKI) has been developed. Once PKI has established a secure connection, a symmetric key can be shared between endpoints. A symmetric key is preferred over public-key encryption for bulk data transfer as a symmetric cipher is much more efficient (uses fewer CPU cycles) than an asymmetric cipher. There are several methods for encrypting data in transit, such as IPsec, SCP, SFTP, SSH, OpenPGP and HTTPS.

== Data at rest ==
Data at rest refers to data stored on persistent storage. Data at rest is generally encrypted by a symmetric key.

Encryption may be applied at different layers in the storage stack. For example, encryption can be configured at the disk layer, on a subset of a disk called a partition, on a volume, which is a combination of disks or partitions, at the layer of a file system, or within user space applications such as database or other applications that run on the host operating system.

With full disk encryption, the entire disk is encrypted (except for the bits necessary to boot or access the disk when not using an unencrypted boot/preboot partition). As disks can be partitioned into multiple partitions, partition encryption can be used to encrypt individual disk partitions. Volumes, created by combining two or more partitions, can be encrypted using volume encryption. File systems, also composed of one or more partitions, can be encrypted using filesystem-level encryption. A directory is considered encrypted when the files it contains are encrypted. File encryption encrypts a single file. Database encryption acts on the data to be stored, accepting unencrypted information and writing that information to persistent storage only after it has encrypted the data. Device-level encryption, a somewhat vague term that includes encryption-capable tape drives, can be used to offload the encryption tasks from the CPU.

== Transit of data at rest ==
When there is a need to securely transmit data at rest, without the ability to create a secure connection, user space tools have been developed that support this need. These tools rely upon the receiver publishing their public key, and the sender being able to obtain that public key. The sender is then able to create a symmetric key to encrypt the information, and then use the receiver's public key to securely protect the transmission of the information and the symmetric key. This allows secure transmission of information from one party to another.

== Performance ==
The performance of encryption software is measured relative to the speed of the CPU. Thus, cycles per byte (sometimes abbreviated cpb), a unit indicating the number of clock cycles a microprocessor will need per byte of data processed, is the usual unit of measurement. Cycles per byte serve as a partial indicator of real-world performance in cryptographic functions. Applications may offer their own encryption, often called native encryption, including database applications such as Microsoft SQL, Oracle, and MongoDB, and commonly rely on direct usage of CPU cycles for performance. This often impacts the desirability of encryption in businesses seeking greater security and ease of satisfying compliance by impacting the speed and scale of how data within organizations through to their partners.

== See also ==
- Code as speech
- Cryptographic Protocol
- Public Key (Asymmetric) Algorithms
- Symmetric Algorithms
- Transport Layer Security
- Comparison of disk encryption software
- Ransomware: Malicious software using encryption
