= Two-square cipher =

Encryption technique

The Two-square cipher, also called double Playfair, is a manual symmetric encryption technique. It was developed to ease the cumbersome nature of the large encryption/decryption matrix used in the four-square cipher while still being slightly stronger than the single-square Playfair cipher.

The technique encrypts pairs of letters (digraphs), and thus falls into a category of ciphers known as polygraphic substitution ciphers. This adds significant strength to the encryption when compared with monographic substitution ciphers, which operate on single characters. The use of digraphs makes the two-square technique less susceptible to frequency analysis attacks, as the analysis must be done on 676 possible digraphs rather than just 26 for monographic substitution. The frequency analysis of digraphs is possible, but considerably more difficult, and it generally requires a much larger ciphertext in order to be useful.

== History ==
Félix Delastelle described the cipher in his 1901 book Traité élémentaire de cryptographie under the name damiers bigrammatiques réduits (reduced digraphic checkerboard), with both horizontal and vertical types.

The two-alphabet checkerboard was described by William F. Friedman in his book Advanced Military Cryptography (1931) and in the later Military Cryptanalysis and Military Cryptanalytics series.

Friedman's co-author on Military Cryptanalytics, Lambros D. Callimahos described the cipher in Collier's Encyclopedia in the Cryptography article.

The encyclopedia description was then adapted into an article in The Cryptogram of the American Cryptogram Association in 1972. After this, the cipher became a regular cipher type in ACA puzzles.

In 1987, Noel Currer‐Briggs described the double Playfair cipher used by Germans in World War II. In this case, double Playfair refers to a method using two Polybius squares plus seriation.

Even variants of Double Playfair that encipher each pair of letters twice are considered weaker than the double transposition cipher.

... by the middle of 1915, the Germans had completely broken down British Playfair. At the same time they recognised its flexibility and simplicity, and decided they could make it more secure and adapt it for their own use. Instead of using one 5 x 5 square and dividing the clear text into bigrams in the way I have just described, they used two squares and wrote the whole message out in key-lengths on specially prepared squared message forms arranged in double lines of a given length.

— Noel Currer-Briggs

Other slight variants, also incorporating seriation, are described in Schick (1987) and David (1996).

The two-square cipher is not described in some other 20th century popular cryptography books e.g. by Helen Fouché Gaines (1939) or William Maxwell Bowers (1959), although both describe the Playfair cipher and four-square cipher.

== Using two-square ==
The two-square cipher uses two 5x5 matrices and comes in two varieties, horizontal and vertical. The horizontal two-square has the two matrices side by side. The vertical two-square has one below the other. Each of the 5x5 matrices contains the letters of the alphabet (usually omitting "Q" or putting both "I" and "J" in the same location to reduce the alphabet to fit). The alphabets in both squares are generally mixed alphabets, each based on some keyword or phrase.

To generate the 5x5 matrices, one would first fill in the spaces in the matrix with the letters of a keyword or phrase (dropping any duplicate letters), then fill the remaining spaces with the rest of the letters of the alphabet in order (again omitting "Q" to reduce the alphabet to fit). The key can be written in the top rows of the table, from left to right, or in some other pattern, such as a spiral beginning in the upper-left-hand corner and ending in the center. The keyword together with the conventions for filling in the 5x5 table constitute the cipher key. The two-square algorithm allows for two separate keys, one for each matrix.

As an example, here are the vertical two-square matrices for the keywords "example" and "keyword":

E X A M P
L B C D F
G H I J K
N O R S T
U V W Y Z
 
K E Y W O
R D A B C
F G H I J
L M N P S
T U V X Z

== Algorithm ==
Encryption using two-square is basically the same as the system used in four-square, except that the plaintext and ciphertext digraphs use the same matrixes.

To encrypt a message, one would Follow these steps:

- Split the payload message into digraphs. (help me obi wan kenobi becomes he lp me ob iw an ke no bi)
- For a vertical two-square, the first character of both plaintext and ciphertext digraphs uses the top matrix, while the second character uses the bottom.
- For a horizontal two-square, the first character of both digraphs uses the left matrix, while the second character uses the right.
- Find the first letter in the digraph in the upper/left text matrix.

E X A M P
L B C D F
G H I J K
N O R S T
U V W Y Z
 
K E Y W O
R D A B C
F G H I J
L M N P S
T U V X Z

- Find the second letter in the digraph in the lower/right plaintext matrix.

E X A M P
L B C D F
G H I J K
N O R S T
U V W Y Z
 
K E Y W O
R D A B C
F G H I J
L M N P S
T U V X Z

- A rectangle is defined by the two plaintext characters and the opposite corners define the ciphertext digraph.

E X A M P
L B C D F
G H I J K
N O R S T
U V W Y Z
 
K E Y W O
R D A B C
F G H I J
L M N P S
T U V X Z

Using the vertical two-square example given above, we can encrypt the following plaintext:

Plaintext:  he lp me ob iw an ke no bi
Ciphertext: HE DL XW SD JY AN HO TK DG

Here is the same two-square written out again but blanking all of the values that aren't used for encrypting the digraph "LP" into "DL"

- - - - -
L - - D -
- - - - -
- - - - -
- - - - -
 
- - - - -
- - - - -
- - - - -
L - - P -
- - - - -

The rectangle rule used to encrypt and decrypt can be seen clearly in this diagram. The method for decrypting is identical to the method for encryption.

Just like Playfair (and unlike four-square), there are special circumstances when the two letters in a digraph are in the same column for vertical two-square or in the same row for horizontal two-square. For vertical two-square, a plaintext digraph that ends up with both characters in the same column gives the same digraph in the ciphertext. For horizontal two-square, a plaintext digraph with both characters in the same row gives (by convention) that digraph with the characters reversed in the ciphertext. In cryptography this is referred to as a transparency. (The horizontal version is sometimes called a reverse transparency.) Notice in the above example how the digraphs "HE" and "AN" mapped to themselves. A weakness of two-square is that about 20% of digraphs will be transparencies.

E X A M P
L B C D F
G H I J K
N O R S T
U V W Y Z
 
K E Y W O
R D A B C
F G H I J
L M N P S
T U V X Z

== Two-square cryptanalysis ==
Like most pre-modern era ciphers, the two-square cipher can be easily cracked if there is enough text. Obtaining the key is relatively straightforward if both plaintext and ciphertext are known. When only the ciphertext is known, brute force cryptanalysis of the cipher involves searching through the key space for matches between the frequency of occurrence of digraphs (pairs of letters) and the known frequency of occurrence of digraphs in the assumed language of the original message.

Cryptanalysis of two-square almost always revolves around the transparency weakness. Depending on whether vertical or horizontal two-square was used, either the ciphertext or the reverse of the ciphertext should show a significant number of plaintext fragments. In a large enough ciphertext sample, there are likely to be several transparent digraphs in a row, revealing possible word fragments. From these word fragments the analyst can generate candidate plaintext strings and work backwards to the keyword.

A good tutorial on reconstructing the key for a two-square cipher can be found in chapter 7, "Solution to Polygraphic Substitution Systems," of Field Manual 34-40-2, produced by the United States Army.

== See also ==
- Topics in cryptography
- Playfair cipher
