= Wireless telegraphy in the Italo-Turkish War =

The use of wireless telegraphy in the Italo-Turkish war was the first example of its large-scale military application, its origins dating from the end of the 1880s.

For the war in Libya, the Corps of Engineers established the first regular large-scale use of wireless in the field. The sole precedent – but on a more limited scale – was that of the German army during the Herero Wars in South West Africa (the present Namibia) in July 1906.

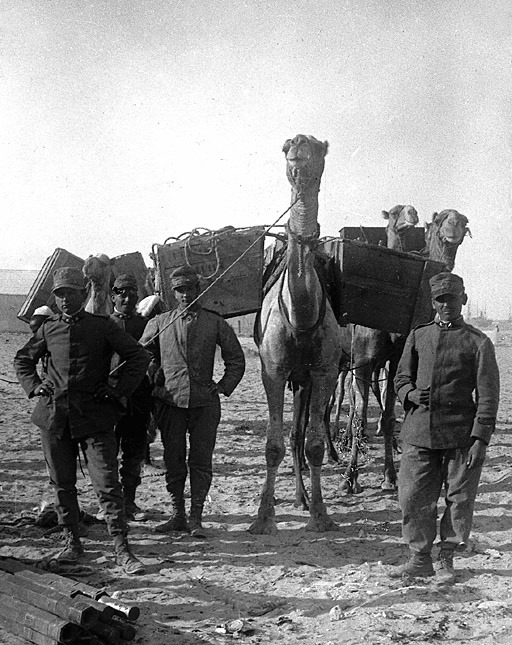
Camels transporting wireless equipment

The Italian wireless stations became important in the wake of the initial landings, and were used for communications between the fleet and the Corps of Logistics. In charge of the wireless detachment in Tripoli was the then Lieutenant Luigi Sacco, who arrived in Libya on 9 October 1911 a few days after the outbreak of hostilities.

On 16 December he was joined in Tripoli by Italian inventor and radio pioneer Guglielmo Marconi, who with Sacco and in the presence of the commander of the Italian expeditionary force, General Caneva, conducted a series of tests with Italy using a simple wire aerial laid out on the sand.

Marconi's experiments demonstrated the feasibility of a wireless telegraphy network across a desert terrain lacking in infrastructure, as was the case in places such as Libya. During the following months the WT detachment would set up a network that was controlled from a 1.5 kW spark transmitter on the quayside of the Turkish fort at Tripoli. Other stations were set up at Misurate, Sirte, Misda and Beni Ulid.

One major problem was how to transport the WT stations across sandy desert tracks. Luigi Sacco was obliged to move the equipment via camels, the only convenient means in such a situation. Using camels, the Corps of Engineers soon set up new wireless stations along tracks that had been secured.

Wireless would play an important role and highlight the potential of this new means of communication, also for military purposes. It was a means with potential – but also with risks because wireless transmissions can easily be intercepted. With regard to the tests that he carried out with Marconi, Luigi Sacco would write, "It is obvious that the enemy can do the same – hence the need to always encipher wireless transmissions." This weakness would only be fully appreciated during World War I, at the start of which only the French and Austrian armies had well organised cipher departments. In Italy it was left to Luigi Sacco to set up the first cipher department at the army high command.
