= Bifid cipher =

Encryption system

In classical cryptography, the bifid cipher is a cipher which combines the Polybius square with transposition, and uses fractionation to achieve diffusion. It was invented around 1901 by Felix Delastelle.

== Operation ==
First, a mixed alphabet Polybius square is drawn up, where the I and the J share their position:

	1	2	3	4	5
1	B	G	W	K	Z
2	Q	P	N	D	S
3	I	O	A	X	E
4	F	C	L	U	M
5	T	H	Y	V	R

The message is converted to its coordinates in the usual manner, but they are written vertically beneath:

F	L	E	E	A	T	O	N	C	E
4	4	3	3	3	5	3	2	4	3
1	3	5	5	3	1	2	3	2	5

They are then read out in rows:

4	4	3	3	3	5	3	2	4	3	1	3	5	5	3	1	2	3	2	5

Then divided up into pairs again, and the pairs turned back into letters using the square:

44	33	35	32	43	13	55	31	23	25
U	A	E	O	L	W	R	I	N	S

In this way, each ciphertext character depends on two plaintext characters, so the bifid is a digraphic cipher, like the Playfair cipher.

To decrypt, use the same Polybius square. Convert the ciphertext to its coordinates in the usual manner, but keep it written in a single row.

U	A	E	O	L	W	R	I	N	S
44	33	35	32	43	13	55	31	23	25

4	4	3	3	3	5	3	2	4	3	1	3	5	5	3	1	2	3	2	5

Find the midpoint of the row.

4	4	3	3	3	5	3	2	4	3	X	1	3	5	5	3	1	2	3	2	5

Take all of the digits to the right of the midpoint and move them to a second row directly below the first.

Convert these vertical pair coordinates to find the plaintext.

4	4	3	3	3	5	3	2	4	3
1	3	5	5	3	1	2	3	2	5
F	L	E	E	A	T	O	N	C	E

Longer messages are first broken up into blocks of fixed length, called the period, and the above encryption procedure is applied to each block. One way to detect the period uses bigram statistics on ciphertext letters separated by half the period. For even periods, p, as in the example above (p=10), ciphertext letters at a distance of p/2 are influenced by two plaintext letters (e. g., U and W are influenced by F and L), but for odd periods, p, ciphertext letters at distances of p/2 (rounded either up or down) are influenced by three plaintext letters. Thus, odd periods are more secure than even against this form of cryptanalysis, because it would require more text to find a statistical anomaly in trigram plaintext statistics than bigram plaintext statistics.

== See also ==
- Other ciphers by Delastelle:
  - four-square cipher (related to Playfair)
  - trifid cipher (similar to bifid)
