= Edouard Fleissner von Wostrowitz =

Edouard Fleissner von Wostrowitz (1825–1888), also spelt Fleißner, is remembered as the author of a short book on cryptography and as the proponent of a modified Cardan grille known as a turning grille.

He was born in Lemberg, the son of an Austrian cavalry officer, and was expected to follow a military career. After serving in the Chevaux-légeres Regiment Number 6, he was appointed Commandant of the Officer School at Ödenberg in 1871 and promoted to full colonel in 1872. Before retirement, at the end of 1874, he was ennobled and became Kommandant Oberst Edouard Freiherr von Fleißner von Wostrowitz.

His book Handbuch der Kryptographie was published in Vienna, in 1881. Jules Verne popularised the turning grille in his novel Mathias Sandorf, published in 1885, by using it as a plot device. Later, the German Army adopted turning grilles of various sizes during the First World War for immediate cipher traffic.

References to Fleißner are found in German, French, Italian and Spanish. Kahn and Gaines mention him in English. Kahn describes the turning grille in his standard work The Codebreakers but gives the name Fleissner only in relation to Jules Verne and the appearance of ciphers in literature.
