= Félix Delastelle =

Félix-Marie Delastelle (2 January 1840 – 2 April 1902) was a French cryptographer, best known for inventing the bifid cipher, first presented in the Revue du Génie civil in 1895 under the name of "cryptographie nouvelle". This cipher combines fractionation with transposition, and was an early cipher to implement the principles of confusion and diffusion. David Kahn described it as a "system of considerable importance in cryptology."

Delastelle's other polygraphic substitution ciphers included the trifid and four-square ciphers. The last of these is a variant on the earlier Playfair cipher: Delastelle may have been unaware of Playfair, but he had certainly read of the fractionating cipher described by Pliny Chase in 1859.

There are few biographical details. Félix-Marie's father, a master mariner, was lost at sea in 1843. Félix attended the College of Saint-Malo until 1860. After leaving school, he worked in the local port, as a bonded warehouseman, for forty years, and pursued his interest in amateur cryptography as a hobby.

Following his retirement in 1900, he rented a single room in a holiday hotel where he wrote a 160-page book Traité Élémentaire de Cryptographie which he completed in May 1901. On hearing news of his brother's sudden death, he collapsed and died in April 1902. His book appeared three months later, published by Gauthier-Villars of Paris.

Delastelle is unusual for being an amateur cryptographer at a time when significant contributions to the subject were made by professional soldiers, diplomats and academics.
