= Helen Fouché Gaines =

Member of the American Cryptogram Association (1888–1940)

- Born: October 12, 1888; Hot Springs, Arkansas
- Died: April 2, 1940 (aged 51); Lake Village, Arkansas
- Resting place: Lake Village, Arkansas

Helen Fouché Gaines (October 12, 1888 – April 2, 1940) was a member of the American Cryptogram Association and editor of the book Cryptanalysis (originally Elementary Cryptanalysis) first published in 1939. The book described the principal cryptographic systems of the 19th century and cracking methods including elementary contact analysis. Her pen name was PICCOLA. Shortly after the publication of the book, she died.

== Publications ==
- Gaines, Helen Fouché (1956) [1939]. Cryptanalysis - a study of ciphers and their solution. Dover. ISBN 0-486-20097-3.
