= Jacopo Silvestri =

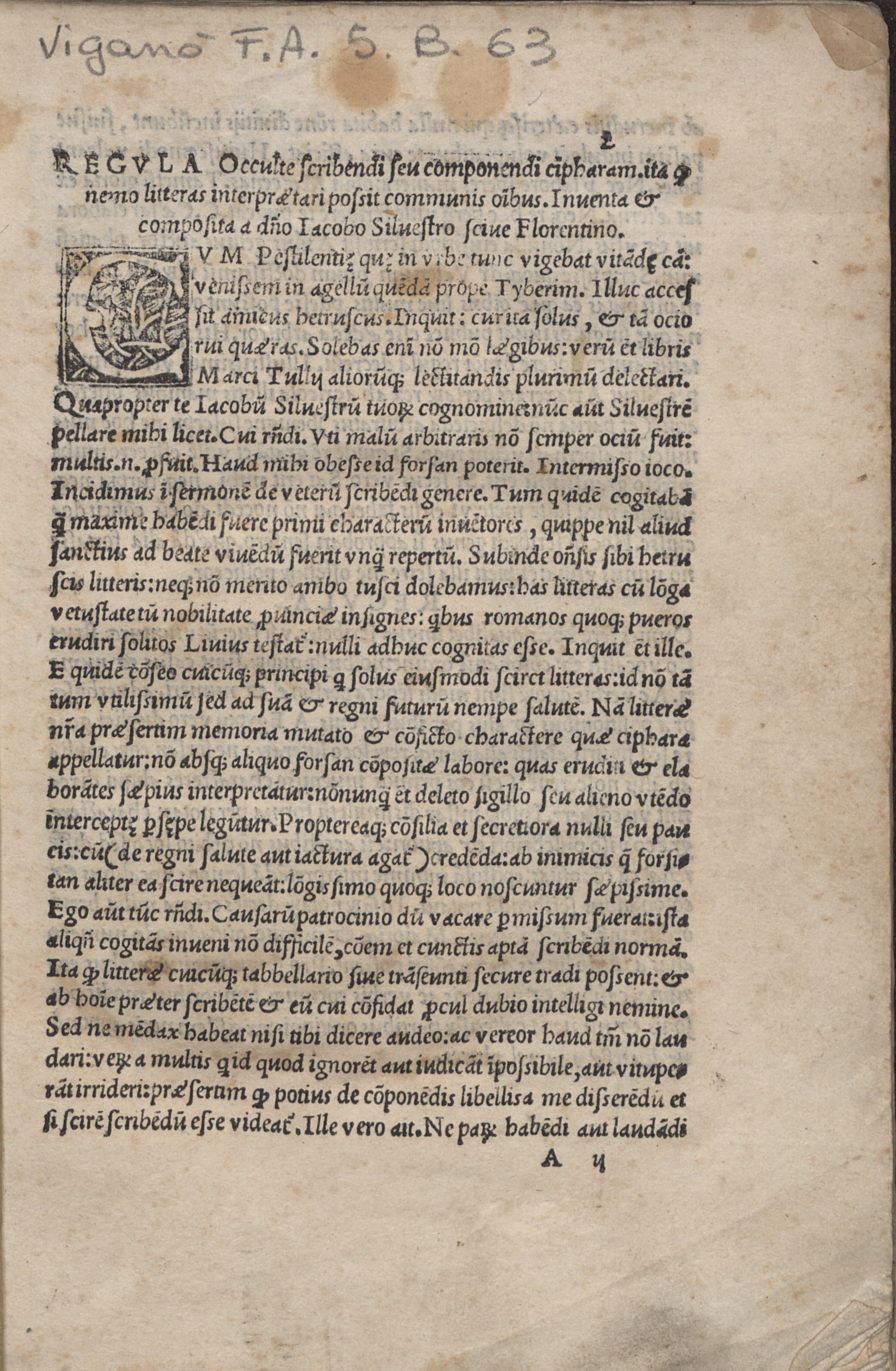
Opus novum praefectis arcium

Jacopo Silvestri was an Italian cryptographer and author active in the early 16th century.

He was a citizen of the Republic of Florence. Little is known about his life; his Opus novum ("New work") provides some information about him and his work, and is considered the second printed work about cryptography.

== Works ==
- Silvestri, Jacopo (1526). Opus novum praefectis arcium (in Latin). Rome. OCLC 947960381.
