= Lester S. Hill =

American mathematician (1891–1961)

Dr. Lester S. Hill
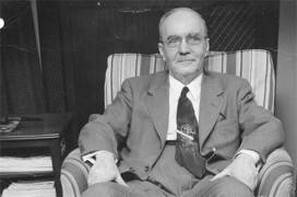
- Lester S. Hill on May 16, 1956
- Born: Lester Sanders Hil; January 18, 1891; New York City
- Died: January 9, 1961 (aged 69); Bronxville, New York
- Occupations: mathematician and cryptographer
- Known for: the Hill cipher (1929)
- Notable work: Cryptography in an Algebraic Alphabet (1929)

Lester S. Hill (1891–1961) was an American mathematician and educator who was interested in applications of mathematics to communications. He received a bachelor's degree (1911) and a master's degree (1913) from Columbia College and a Ph.D. from Yale University (1926). He taught at the University of Montana, Princeton University, the University of Maine, Yale University, and Hunter College. Among his notable contributions was the Hill cipher. He also developed methods for detecting errors in telegraphed code numbers and wrote two books.
