= Luigi Sacco =

Italian general and cryptanalyst

Luigi Sacco (1 August 1883 in Alba – 5 December 1970 in Rome) was an Italian general and cryptanalyst.

When Italy entered into World War I, he was a captain serving with radio-telegraphy troops. As a specialist in direction finding, he led the effort to locate and intercept Austro-Hungarian radiograms on the frontline, but due to a lack of cryptanalysts, they weren't being decrypted, so in 1916 he had to learn cryptanalysis himself. After the war he wrote books on cryptography.

== Bibliography ==
- Manual of Cryptology ("Manuale di Crittografia") (1936) ISBN 0-89412-016-6
