= NewDES =

Block cipher

General
- Designers: Robert Scott
- First published: 1985

Cipher detail
- Key sizes: 120 bits
- Block sizes: 64 bits
- Rounds: 17

Best public cryptanalysis
- A related-key attack succeeds with 2^{32} known plaintexts

In cryptography, NewDES is a symmetric key block cipher. It was created in 1984–1985 by Robert Scott as a potential DES replacement.

Despite its name, it is not derived from DES and has quite a different structure. Its intended niche as a DES replacement has now mostly been filled by AES. The algorithm was revised with a modified key schedule in 1996 to counter a related-key attack; this version is sometimes referred to as NewDES-96.

In 2004, Scott posted some comments on sci.crypt reflecting on the motivation behind NewDES's design and what he might have done differently so as to make the cipher more secure.

== Algorithm ==
NewDES, unlike DES, has no bit-level permutations, making it easy to implement in software. All operations are performed on whole bytes. It is a product cipher, consisting of 17 rounds performed on a 64-bit data block and makes use of a 120-bit key.

In each round, subkey material is XORed with the 1-byte sub-blocks of data, then fed through an S-box, the output of which is then XORed with another sub-block of data. In total, 8 XORs are performed in each round. The S-box is derived from the United States Declaration of Independence (used as a nothing-up-my-sleeve number).

Each set of two rounds uses seven 1-byte subkeys, which are derived by splitting 56 bits of the key into bytes. The key is then rotated 56 bits for use in the next two rounds.

== Cryptanalysis ==
Only a small amount of cryptanalysis has been published on NewDES. The designer showed that NewDES exhibits the full avalanche effect after seven rounds: every ciphertext bit depends on every plaintext bit and key bit.

NewDES has the same complementation property that DES has: namely, that if

$$E_K(P)=C,$$

then

$$E_{\overline{K}}(\overline{P})=\overline{C},$$

where

$$\overline{x}$$

is the bitwise complement of x. This means that the work factor for a brute force attack is reduced by a factor of 2. Eli Biham also noticed that changing a full byte in all the key and data bytes leads to another complementation property. This reduces the work factor by 2^{8}.

Biham's related-key attack can break NewDES with 2^{33} chosen-key chosen plaintexts, meaning that NewDES is not as secure as DES.

John Kelsey, Bruce Schneier, and David Wagner used related-key cryptanalysis to develop another attack on NewDES; it requires 2^{32} known plaintexts and one related key.
