= ARIA (cipher) =

Block cipher

General
- First published: 2003
- Derived from: AES
- Certification: South Korean standard

Cipher detail
- Key sizes: 128, 192, or 256 bits
- Block sizes: 128 bits
- Structure: Substitution–permutation network
- Rounds: 12, 14, or 16

Best public cryptanalysis
- Meet-in-the-middle attack on 8 rounds with data complexity 2^{56}

In cryptography, ARIA is a block cipher designed in 2003 by a large group of South Korean researchers. In 2004, the Korean Agency for Technology and Standards selected it as a standard cryptographic technique.

The algorithm uses a substitution–permutation network structure based on AES. The interface is the same as AES: 128-bit block size with key size of 128, 192, or 256 bits. The number of rounds is 12, 14, or 16, depending on the key size. ARIA uses two 8×8-bit S-boxes and their inverses in alternate rounds; one of these is the Rijndael S-box.

The key schedule processes the key using a 3-round 256-bit Feistel cipher, with the binary expansion of 1/π as a source of "nothing up my sleeve numbers".

== Implementations ==
The reference source code of ARIA cipher implemented in C, C++, and Java can be downloaded from KISA's cryptography use activation webpage.

== Standardization ==
- KATS
  - KS X 1213:2004
- IETF
  - Algorithm
    - RFC 5794: A Description of the ARIA Encryption Algorithm
  - TLS/SSL
    - RFC 6209: Addition of the ARIA Cipher Suites to Transport Layer Security (TLS)
  - SRTP
    - RFC 8269: The ARIA Algorithm and Its Use with the Secure Real-Time Transport Protocol (SRTP)

== Security ==
- A. Biryukov; C. De Cannière; J. Lano; B. Preneel; S. B. Örs (January 7, 2004). Security and Performance Analysis of ARIA (PDF) (Report). Version 1.2—Final Report. Katholieke Universiteit Leuven.
- Wenling Wu; Wentao Zhang; Dengguo Feng (2006). "Impossible Differential Cryptanalysis of ARIA and Camellia". Cryptology ePrint Archive.
- Xuehai Tang; Bing Sun; Ruilin Li; Chao Li (March 30, 2010). "A Meet-in-the-Middle Attack on ARIA". Cryptology ePrint Archive.
