= Kuznyechik =

Block cipher

General
- Designers: InfoTeCS JSC
- First published: 2015
- Certification: GOST, and FSS

Cipher detail
- Key sizes: 256-bit Feistel network
- Block sizes: 128 bits
- Structure: Substitution–permutation network
- Rounds: 10

Best public cryptanalysis

Kuznyechik (Russian for 'Grasshopper'; Cyrillic script: Кузнечик) is a symmetric block cipher. It has a block size of 128 bits and key length of 256 bits. It is defined in the National Standard of the Russian Federation GOST R 34.12-2015 and also in RFC 7801. It has received scrutiny for the structure of its S-boxes, which the authors claim were randomly generated.

The name of the cipher can be translated from Russian as grasshopper, however, the standard explicitly says that the English name for the cipher is Kuznyechik (/kʊzˈnɛtʃɪk/). The designers claim that by naming the cipher Kuznyechik they follow the trend of difficult to pronounce algorithm names set up by Rijndael and Keccak. There is also a rumor that the cipher was named after its creators: A. S. Kuzmin, A. A. Nechaev and Company (Russian: Кузьмин, Нечаев и Компания).

The standard GOST R 34.12-2015 defines the new cipher in addition to the old GOST block cipher (now called Magma) as one and does not declare the old cipher obsolete.

Kuznyechik is based on a substitution–permutation network, though the key schedule employs a Feistel network.

== Designations ==
$\mathbb F$ — Finite field $GF(2^8)$ $x^8 + x^7 + x^6 + x + 1$.

$Bin_8 : \Z_p \rightarrow V_8$ — $\Z_p$ ($p=2^8$)

${Bin_8}^{-1}: V_8 \rightarrow \Z_p$ — $Bin_8$.

$\delta: V_8 \rightarrow \mathbb F$ — $\mathbb F$.

$\delta^{-1}: \mathbb F \rightarrow V_8$ — $\delta$

== Description ==
For encryption, decryption and key generation, the following functions:

$Add_2[k](a)=k\oplus a$, where $k$, $a$ are binary strings of the form $a=a_{15}||$...$||a_{0}$ ($||$ is string concatenation).

$N(a)=S(a_{15})||$...$||S(a_{0}).~~N^{-1}(a)$ is a reversed transformation of $N(a)$.

$G(a)=\gamma(a_{15},$...$,a_0)||a_{15}||$...$||a_{1}.$

$G^{-1}(a)$ — reversed transformation of $G(a)$ , $G^{-1}(a)=a_{14}||a_{13}||$...$||a_{0}||\gamma(a_{14},a_{13},$...$,a_0,a_{15}).$

$H(a)=G^{16}(a)$, where $G^{16}$ — composition of transformations $G^{15}$ and $G$ etc.

$F[k](a_1,a_0)=(HNAdd_2[k](a_1)\oplus a_0, a_1).$

=== The nonlinear transformation ===
Non-linear transformation is given by substituting S = Bin_{8} S' Bin_{8}^{−1}.

Values of the substitution S' are given as array S' = (S'(0), S'(1), ..., S'(255)):

$S' = (252, 238, 221, 17, 207, 110, 49, 22, 251, 196, 250, 218, 35, 197, 4, 77, 233,$ $119, 240, 219, 147, 46, 153, 186, 23, 54, 241, 187, 20, 205, 95, 193, 249, 24, 101,$ $90, 226, 92, 239, 33, 129, 28, 60, 66, 139, 1, 142, 79, 5, 132, 2, 174, 227, 106, 143,$ $160, 6, 11, 237, 152, 127, 212, 211, 31, 235, 52, 44, 81, 234, 200, 72, 171, 242, 42,$ $104, 162, 253, 58, 206, 204, 181, 112, 14, 86, 8, 12, 118, 18, 191, 114, 19, 71, 156,$$183, 93, 135, 21, 161, 150, 41, 16, 123, 154, 199, 243, 145, 120, 111, 157, 158, 178,$ $177, 50, 117, 25, 61, 255, 53, 138, 126, 109, 84, 198, 128, 195, 189, 13, 87, 223,$ $245, 36, 169, 62, 168, 67, 201, 215, 121, 214, 246, 124, 34, 185, 3, 224, 15, 236,$ $222, 122, 148, 176, 188, 220, 232, 40, 80, 78, 51, 10, 74, 167, 151, 96, 115, 30, 0,$ $98, 68, 26, 184, 56, 130, 100, 159, 38, 65, 173, 69, 70, 146, 39, 94, 85, 47, 140, 163,$ $165, 125, 105, 213, 149, 59, 7, 88, 179, 64, 134, 172, 29, 247, 48, 55, 107, 228, 136,$ $217, 231, 137, 225, 27, 131, 73, 76, 63, 248, 254, 141, 83, 170, 144, 202, 216, 133,$ $97, 32, 113, 103, 164, 45, 43, 9, 91, 203, 155, 37, 208, 190, 229, 108, 82, 89, 166,$ $116, 210, 230, 244, 180, 192, 209, 102, 175, 194, 57, 75, 99, 182).$

=== Linear transformation ===
$\gamma$: $\gamma(a_{15},$...$, a_0) = \delta^{-1}~(148 * \delta(a_{15}) + 32 * \delta(a_{14}) + 133 * \delta(a_{13}) + 16 * \delta(a_{12}) +$ $194 * \delta(a_{11}) + 192 * \delta(a_{10}) + 1 * \delta(a_9) + 251 * \delta(a_8) + 1 * \delta(a_7) + 192 * \delta(a_6) +$ $194 * \delta(a_5) + 16 * \delta(a_4) + 133 * \delta(a_3) + 32 * \delta(a_2) + 148 * \delta(a_1) + 1 * \delta(a_0)),$

operations of addition and multiplication are carried out in the field $\mathbb F$.

=== Key generation ===
The key generation algorithm uses iterative constant $C_i=H(Bin_{128}(i))$, i=1,2,...32 and sets the shared key as follows: $K=k_{255}||$...$||k_0$.

Iterated keys:

$K_1=k_{255}||$...$||k_{128}$

$K_2=k_{127}||$...$||k_{0}$

$(K_{2i+1}, K_{2i+2})=F[C_{8(i-1)+8}]$...$F[C_{8(i-1)+1}](K_{2i-1}, K_{2i}), i=1, 2, 3, 4.$

=== Encryption algorithm ===
$E(a)=Add_2[K_{10}]HNAdd_2[K_9]$...$HNAdd_2[K_2]HNAdd_2[K_1](a),$ where a — 128-bit string.

=== Decryption algorithm ===
$D(a)=Add_2[K_{1}]N^{-1}H^{-1}Add_2[K_2]$...$N^{-1}H^{-1}Add_2[K_9]N^{-1}H^{-1}Add_2[K_{10}](a).$

== Cryptanalysis ==
Riham AlTawy and Amr M. Youssef describe a meet-in-the-middle attack on the 5-round reduced Kuznyechik which enables recovery of the key with a time complexity of 2^{140}, memory complexity of 2^{153}, and data complexity of 2^{113}.

Alex Biryukov, Leo Perrin, and Aleksei Udovenko published a paper in which they show that the S-boxes of Kuznyechik and Streebog were not created pseudo-randomly but by using a hidden algorithm which they were able to reverse engineer.

Later Leo Perrin and Aleksei Udovenko published two alternative decompositions of the S-box and proved its connection to the S-box of the Belarusian cipher BelT. The authors of the paper note that while the reason for using such a structure remains unclear, generating S-boxes by a hidden algorithm contradicts the concept of nothing-up-my-sleeve numbers which could prove that no weaknesses were intentionally introduced in their design.

Riham AlTawy, Onur Duman, and Amr M. Youssef published two fault attacks on Kuznyechik which show the importance of protecting the implementations of the cipher.

== Adoption ==
VeraCrypt (a fork of TrueCrypt) included Kuznyechik as one of its supported encryption algorithms.

== Source code ==
- https://web.archive.org/web/20160424051147/http://tc26.ru/standard/draft/PR_GOSTR-bch_v4.zip
- https://web.archive.org/web/20180406230057/https://fossies.org/windows/misc/VeraCrypt_1.22_Source.zip/src/Crypto/kuznyechik.c (alternative link in case the first link is not working)
