= MacGuffin (cipher) =

Block cipher

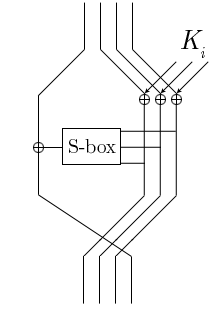
- The Feistel function of the MacGuffin cipher

General
- Designers: Bruce Schneier, Matt Blaze
- First published: 1994-12-14
- Derived from: DES

Cipher detail
- Key sizes: 128 bits
- Block sizes: 64 bits
- Structure: Unbalanced Feistel network
- Rounds: 32

In cryptography, MacGuffin is a block cipher created in 1994 by Bruce Schneier and Matt Blaze at a Fast Software Encryption workshop. It was intended as a catalyst for analysis of a new cipher structure, known as Generalized Unbalanced Feistel Networks (GUFNs). The cryptanalysis proceeded very quickly, so quickly that the cipher was broken at the same workshop by Vincent Rijmen and Bart Preneel.

== The algorithm ==
Schneier and Blaze based MacGuffin on DES, their main change being that the data block is not split into equal halves in the Feistel network. Instead, 48 bits of the 64-bit data block are fed through the round function, whose output is XORed with the other 16 bits of the data block. The algorithm was experimental, intended to explore the security properties of unbalanced Feistel networks.

The adjacent diagram shows one round of MacGuffin. The 64-bit data block is broken into four 16-bit words (each represented by one line). The rightmost three are XORed with subkey bits derived from the secret key. They are then fed through eight S-boxes, each of which takes six bits of input and produces two bits of output. The output (a total of 16 bits) is then recombined and XORed with the leftmost word of the data block. The new leftmost block is then rotated into the rightmost position of the resulting data block. The algorithm then continues with more rounds.

MacGuffin's key schedule is a modified version of the encryption algorithm itself. Since MacGuffin is a Feistel network, decryption is easy; simply run the encryption algorithm in reverse.

Schneier and Blaze recommended using 32 rounds, and specified MacGuffin with a 128-bit key.

== Cryptanalysis of MacGuffin ==
At the same workshop where MacGuffin was introduced, Rijmen and Preneel showed that it was vulnerable to differential cryptanalysis. They showed that 32 rounds of MacGuffin is weaker than 16 rounds of DES, since it took "a few hours" to get good differential characteristics for DES with good starting values, and the same time to get good differential characteristics for MacGuffin with no starting values. They found that it is possible to get the last round key with differential cryptanalysis, and from that reverse the last round; and then repeat the attack for the rest of the rounds.

Rijmen and Preneel tried attacking MacGuffin with different S-boxes, taken directly from DES. This version proved to be slightly stronger, but they warn that designing an algorithm to resist only known attacks is generally not a good design principle.
