= Substitution–permutation network =

Cipher design construction

A sketch of a substitution–permutation network with 3 rounds, encrypting a plaintext block of 16 bits into a ciphertext block of 16 bits. The S-boxes are the S_{i}, the P-boxes are the same P, and the round keys are the K_{i}.

In cryptography, an SP-network, or substitution–permutation network (SPN), is a series of linked mathematical operations used in block cipher algorithms such as AES (Rijndael), 3-Way, Kalyna, Kuznyechik, PRESENT, SAFER, SHARK, and Square.

Such a network takes a block of the plaintext and the key as inputs, and applies several alternating rounds or layers of substitution boxes (S-boxes) and permutation boxes (P-boxes) to produce the ciphertext block. The S-boxes and P-boxes transform (sub-)blocks of input bits into output bits. It is common for these transformations to be operations that are efficient to perform in hardware, such as exclusive or (XOR) and bitwise rotation. The key is introduced in each round, usually in the form of "round keys" derived from it. (In some designs, the S-boxes themselves depend on the key.)

Decryption is done by simply reversing the process (using the inverses of the S-boxes and P-boxes and applying the round keys in reversed order).

== Components ==
An S-box substitutes a small block of bits (the input of the S-box) by another block of bits (the output of the S-box). This substitution should be one-to-one, to ensure invertibility (hence decryption). In particular, the length of the output should be the same as the length of the input (the picture on the right has S-boxes with 4 input and 4 output bits), which is different from S-boxes in general that could also change the length, as in Data Encryption Standard (DES), for example. An S-box is usually not simply a permutation of the bits. Rather, in a good S-box each output bit will be affected by every input bit. More precisely, in a good S-box each output bit will be changed with 50% probability by every input bit. Since each output bit changes with 50% probability, about half of the output bits will actually change with an input bit change (cf. Strict avalanche criterion).

A P-box is a permutation of all the bits: it takes the outputs of all the S-boxes of one round, permutes the bits, and feeds them into the S-boxes of the next round. A good P-box has the property that the output bits of any S-box are distributed to as many S-box inputs as possible.

At each round, the round key (obtained from the key with some simple operations, for instance, using S-boxes and P-boxes) is combined using some group operation, typically XOR.

== Properties ==
A single typical S-box or a single P-box alone does not have much cryptographic strength: an S-box could be thought of as a substitution cipher, while a P-box could be thought of as a transposition cipher. However, a well-designed SP-network with several alternating rounds of S- and P-boxes already satisfies Shannon's confusion and diffusion properties:

- The reason for diffusion is the following: If one changes one bit of the plaintext, then it is fed into an S-box, whose output will change at several bits, then all these changes are distributed by the P-box among several S-boxes, hence the outputs of all of these S-boxes are again changed at several bits, and so on. Doing several rounds, each bit changes several times back and forth, therefore, by the end, the ciphertext has changed completely, in a pseudorandom manner. In particular, for a randomly chosen input block, if one flips the i-th bit, then the probability that the j-th output bit will change is approximately a half, for any i and j, which is the strict avalanche criterion. Vice versa, if one changes one bit of the ciphertext and then attempts to decrypt it, the result is a message completely different from the original plaintext – SP-ciphers are not easily malleable.
- The reason for confusion is exactly the same as for diffusion: changing one bit of the key changes several of the round keys, and every change in every round key diffuses over all the bits, changing the ciphertext in a very complex manner.
- If an attacker somehow obtains one plaintext corresponding to one ciphertext – a known-plaintext attack, or worse, a chosen plaintext or chosen-ciphertext attack – the confusion and diffusion make it difficult for the attacker to recover the key.

== Performance ==
Although a Feistel network that uses S-boxes (such as DES) is quite similar to SP-networks, there are some differences that make either this or that more applicable in certain situations. For a given amount of confusion and diffusion, an SP-network has more "inherent parallelism" and so — given a CPU with many execution units — can be computed faster than a Feistel network. CPUs with few execution units — such as most smart cards — cannot take advantage of this inherent parallelism. Also SP-ciphers require S-boxes to be invertible (to perform decryption); Feistel inner functions have no such restriction and can be constructed as one-way functions.

== See also ==
- Feistel network
- Product cipher
- Square (cipher)
- International Data Encryption Algorithm
