= ICE (cipher) =

Block cipher

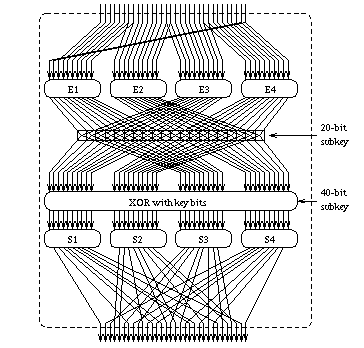
- The ICE Feistel function

General
- Designers: Matthew Kwan
- First published: 1997
- Derived from: DES

Cipher detail
- Key sizes: 64 bits (ICE), 64×n bits (ICE-n)
- Block sizes: 64 bits
- Structure: Feistel network
- Rounds: 16 (ICE), 8 (Thin-ICE), 16×n (ICE-n)

Best public cryptanalysis
- Differential cryptanalysis can break 15 out of 16 rounds of ICE with complexity 2^{56}. Thin-ICE can be broken using 2^{27} chosen plaintexts with a success probability of 95%.

In cryptography, ICE (Information Concealment Engine) is a symmetric-key block cipher published by Matthew Kwan in 1997. The algorithm is similar in structure to DES, but with the addition of a key-dependent bit permutation in the round function. The key-dependent bit permutation is implemented efficiently in software. The ICE algorithm is not subject to patents, and the source code has been placed into the public domain.

ICE is a Feistel network with a block size of 64 bits. The standard ICE algorithm takes a 64-bit key and has 16 rounds. A fast variant, Thin-ICE, uses only 8 rounds. An open-ended variant, ICE-n, uses 16n rounds with 64n bit key.

Van Rompay et al. (1998) attempted to apply differential cryptanalysis to ICE. They described an attack on Thin-ICE which recovers the secret key using 2^{23} chosen plaintexts with a 25% success probability. If 2^{27} chosen plaintexts are used, the probability can be improved to 95%. For the standard version of ICE, an attack on 15 out of 16 rounds was found, requiring 2^{56} work and at most 2^{56} chosen plaintexts.

== Structure ==
ICE is a 16-round Feistel network. Each round uses a 32→32 bit F function, which uses 60 bits of key material.

The structure of the F function is somewhat similar to DES: The input is expanded by taking overlapping fields, the expanded input is XORed with a key, and the result is fed to a number of reducing S-boxes which undo the expansion.

First, ICE divides the input into 4 overlapping 10-bit values. They are bits 30, 31 and 0–7 of the input for the first 10-bit value and for the next values 6–15, 14–23, and 22–31.

Second is a keyed permutation, which is unique to ICE. Using a 20-bit permutation subkey, bits are swapped between halves of the 40-bit expanded input. (If subkey bit i is 1, then bits i and i+20 are swapped.)

Third, the 40-bit value is XORed with 40 more subkey bits.

Fourth, the value is fed through 4 10-bit S-boxes, each of which produces 8 bits of output. (These are much larger than DES's 8 6→4 bit S-boxes.)

Fifth, the S-box output bits are permuted so that each S-box's outputs are routed to each 4-bit field of 32-bit word, including 2 of the 8 "overlap" bits duplicated during the next round's expansion.

Like DES, a software implementation would typically store the S-boxes pre-permuted, in 4 1024×32 bit lookup tables.
