= Permutation box =

Method of bit-shuffling used to diffuse bits across S-box inputs

In cryptography, a permutation box (or P-box) is a method of bit-shuffling used to permute or transpose bits across S-boxes inputs, creating diffusion while transposing.

An example of a 64-bit "expansion" P-box which spreads the input S-boxes to as many output S-boxes as possible.

In block ciphers based on substitution-permutation network, the P-boxes, together with the "substitution" S-boxes are used to make the relation between the plaintext and the ciphertext difficult to understand (see Shannon's Confusion and diffusion). P-boxes are typically classified as compression, expansion, and straight, depending on whether the number of output bits is less than, greater than, or equal to the number of input bits, respectively. Only straight P-boxes are invertible.

== See also ==
- Boolean function
- Nothing-up-my-sleeve number
- Substitution cipher

== Sources ==
- Nayaka, Raja Jitendra; Biradar, R. C. (2013). 2013 Annual International Conference on Emerging Research Areas and 2013 International Conference on Microelectronics, Communications and Renewable Energy. IEEE. doi:10.1109/aicera-icmicr.2013.6575944.
