= Feistel =

Feistel is a German surname. Notable people with the surname include:

- Horst Feistel (1915–1990), German American cryptographer
  - Feistel cipher, a construction for designing modern ciphers
- Magdalena Feistel (born 1970), Polish tennis player
- Gina Feistel (born 2003), Polish tennis player
