= D-Box (disambiguation) =

D-Box (variously capitalised and punctuated) may refer to:

- D-BOX Technologies, a Canadian company which produces motion simulation systems
- DBox or DBox 2, German digital television decoders by Nokia
- D-Box drift assist system for RC cars by Hobby Products International
- dbox, an email storage format used by Dovecot (software)
- D-box (also D'box and D box, short for "destruction box"), a structure within certain proteins, such as cyclins, involved in the cell cycle
- D-box, a construction feature in the leading edge of some airplane wings, from the spar forward, which provides strength and minimizes twisting.
- D-box, a linear component of the bricklayer function
