= Bricklayer function =

Decomposable function in cryptography

The SubBytes transformation of the Advanced Encryption Standard is a notable example of a bricklayer function: each 8-bit bundle of the 128-bit state is undergoing the same S-box transformation independently

In cryptography, the bricklayer function is a part of a round function that can be decomposed into identical independent Boolean operations on the partitioned pieces of its input data, so called bundles. The term was introduced by Daemen and Rijmen in 2001.

If the underlying function transforming the bundle is nonlinear, it is traditionally called an S-box. If the function is linear, Daemen and Rijmen use for it the term D-box (after diffusion).

== Sources ==
- Daemen, Joan; Rijmen, Vincent (9 March 2013). "Bricklayer Functions". The Design of Rijndael: AES - The Advanced Encryption Standard (PDF). Springer Science & Business Media. pp. 22–23. ISBN 978-3-662-04722-4. OCLC 1259405449.
- Weinmann, Ralf-Philipp (2009). Algebraic Methods in Block Cipher Cryptanalysis (PDF) (PhD). Technischen Universität Darmstadt.
