= Kalyna (cipher) =

Block cipher

General
- First published: 2010; 2014/2015 (Standard)
- Related to: Rijndael (AES)
- Certification: DSTU 7624:2014 (Ukraine)

Cipher detail
- Key sizes: 128, 256 or 512 bits
- Block sizes: 128, 256 or 512 bits
- Structure: SPN
- Rounds: 10, 14 or 18 (depending on key size)

Kalyna (Ukrainian: Калина, Viburnum opulus) is a symmetric block cipher. It supports block sizes of 128, 256 or 512 bits; the key length is either equal to or double the block size.

Kalyna was adopted as the national encryption standard of Ukraine in 2015 (standard DSTU 7624:2014) after holding Ukrainian national cryptographic competition. Kalyna is a substitution–permutation network and its design is based on the Rijndael (AES) encryption function having quite different key schedule, another set of four different S-boxes and increased MDS matrix size.

Kalyna has 10 rounds for 128-bit keys, 14 rounds for 256-bit keys and 18 rounds for 512-bit keys. Independent researchers proposed some attacks on reduced-round variants of Kalyna, but all of them have a very high complexity and none of them are practical.

| Word size | Block size | Key size | Identification | Rounds |
|---|---|---|---|---|
| 64 bits | 128 bits | 1×128 = 128 bits | Kalyna-128/128 | 10 |
| 64 bits | 128 bits | 2×128 = 256 bits | Kalyna-128/256 | 14 |
| 64 bits | 256 bits | 1×256 = 256 bits | Kalyna-256/256 | 14 |
| 64 bits | 256 bits | 2×256 = 512 bits | Kalyna-256/512 | 18 |
| 64 bits | 512 bits | 1×512 = 512 bits | Kalyna-512/512 | 18 |
