= Completeness (cryptography) =

Cryptography term

In cryptography, a boolean function is said to be complete if the value of each output bit depends on all input bits.

This is a desirable property to have in an encryption cipher, so that if one bit of the input (plaintext) is changed, every bit of the output (ciphertext) has an average of 50% probability of changing. The easiest way to show why this is good is the following: consider that if we changed our 8-byte plaintext's last byte, it would only have any effect on the 8th byte of the ciphertext. This would mean that if the attacker guessed 256 different plaintext-ciphertext pairs, they would always know the last byte of every 8byte sequence we send (effectively 12.5% of all our data). Finding out 256 plaintext-ciphertext pairs is not hard at all in the internet world, given that standard protocols are used, and standard protocols have standard headers and commands (e.g. "get", "put", "mail from:", etc.) which the attacker can safely guess. On the other hand, if our cipher has this property (and is generally secure in other ways, too), the attacker would need to collect 2^{64} (~10^{20}) plaintext-ciphertext pairs to crack the cipher in this way.

== See also ==
- Correlation immunity
