= ISO/IEC 10116 =

International standard

ISO/IEC 10116 Information technology — Security techniques — Modes of operation for an n-bit block cipher is an international standard that specifies modes of operation for block ciphers of any length.

The modes defined are:

- Electronic codebook (ECB)
- Cipher block chaining (CBC)
- Cipher feedback (CFB)
- Output feedback (OFB)
- Counter (CTR)

The standard notes that some modes require padding, but states that "Padding techniques ... are not within the scope of this International Standard."
