= Communication Theory of Secrecy Systems =

1949 paper by Claude Shannon

- Author: Claude E. Shannon
- Language: English
- Subject: Cryptography
- Publication date: 1949
- Publication place: United States

"Communication Theory of Secrecy Systems" is a paper published in 1949 by Claude Shannon discussing cryptography from the viewpoint of information theory. It is one of the foundational treatments (arguably the foundational treatment) of modern cryptography. His work has been described as a "turning point, and marked the closure of classical cryptography and the beginning of modern cryptography." It has also been described as turning cryptography from an "art to a science". It is also a proof that all theoretically unbreakable ciphers must have the same requirements as the one-time pad.

The paper serves as the foundation of secret-key cryptography, including the work of Horst Feistel, the Data Encryption Standard (DES), Advanced Encryption Standard (AES), and more. In the paper, Shannon defined unicity distance, and the principles of confusion and diffusion, which are key to a secure cipher.

Shannon published an earlier version of this research in the formerly classified report A Mathematical Theory of Cryptography, Memorandum MM 45-110-02, Sept. 1, 1945, Bell Laboratories. This report also precedes the publication of his "A Mathematical Theory of Communication", which appeared in 1948.

== See also ==
- Confusion and diffusion
- Product cipher
- One-time pad
- Unicity distance
