= Feistel cipher =

Cryptography construction

In cryptography, a Feistel cipher (also known as Luby–Rackoff block cipher) is a symmetric structure used in the construction of block ciphers, named after the German-born physicist and cryptographer Horst Feistel, who did pioneering research while working for IBM; it is also commonly known as a Feistel network. A large number of block ciphers use the scheme, including the US Data Encryption Standard, the Soviet/Russian GOST (aka Magma) and the more recent Blowfish and Twofish ciphers. In a Feistel cipher, encryption and decryption are very similar operations, and both consist of iteratively running a function called a "round function" a fixed number of times.

== History ==
Many modern symmetric block ciphers are based on Feistel networks. Feistel networks were first seen commercially in IBM's Lucifer cipher, designed by Horst Feistel and Don Coppersmith in 1973. Feistel networks gained respectability when the U.S. Federal Government adopted the DES (a cipher based on Lucifer, with changes made by the NSA) in 1976. Like other components of the DES, the iterative nature of the Feistel construction makes implementing the cryptosystem in hardware easier (particularly on the hardware available at the time of DES's design).

== Design ==
A Feistel network uses a round function, a function which takes two inputs – a data block and a subkey – and returns one output of the same size as the data block. In each round, the round function is run on half of the data to be encrypted, and its output is XORed with the other half of the data. This is repeated a fixed number of times, and the final output is the encrypted data. An important advantage of Feistel networks compared to other cipher designs such as substitution–permutation networks (SP-networks) is that the entire operation is guaranteed to be invertible (that is, encrypted data can be decrypted), even if the round function is not itself invertible. The round function can be made arbitrarily complicated, since it does not need to be designed to be invertible. Furthermore, the encryption and decryption operations are very similar, even identical in some cases, requiring only a reversal of the key schedule. Therefore, the size of the code or circuitry required to implement such a cipher is nearly halved. Unlike SP-networks, Feistel networks also do not depend on a substitution box that could cause timing side-channels in software implementations.

== Theoretical work ==
The structure and properties of Feistel ciphers have been extensively analyzed by cryptographers.

Michael Luby and Charles Rackoff analyzed the Feistel cipher construction and proved that if the round function is a cryptographically secure pseudorandom function, with K_{i} used as the seed, then 3 rounds are sufficient to make the block cipher a pseudorandom permutation, while 4 rounds are sufficient to make it a "strong" pseudorandom permutation (which means that it remains pseudorandom even to an adversary who gets oracle access to its inverse permutation). Because of this very important result of Luby and Rackoff, Feistel ciphers are sometimes called Luby–Rackoff block ciphers.

Further theoretical work has generalized the construction somewhat and given more precise bounds for security.

== Construction details ==
Let $\mathrm{F}$ be the round function and let $K_0, K_1, \ldots, K_n$ be the sub-keys for the rounds $0, 1, \ldots, n$ respectively.

Then the basic operation is as follows:

Split the plaintext block into two equal pieces: ($L_0$, $R_0$).

For each round $i = 0, 1, \dots, n$, compute

$$L_{i+1} = R_i,$$
$$R_{i+1}= L_i \oplus \mathrm{F}(R_i, K_i),$$

where $\oplus$ means XOR. Then the ciphertext is $(R_{n+1}, L_{n+1})$.

Decryption of a ciphertext $(R_{n+1}, L_{n+1})$ is accomplished by computing for $i = n, n - 1, \ldots, 0$

$$R_{i} = L_{i+1},$$
$$L_{i} = R_{i+1} \oplus \operatorname{F}(L_{i+1}, K_i).$$

Then $(L_0, R_0)$ is the plaintext again.

The diagram illustrates both encryption and decryption. Note the reversal of the subkey order for decryption; this is the only difference between encryption and decryption.

=== Unbalanced Feistel cipher ===
Unbalanced Feistel ciphers use a modified structure where $L_0$ and $R_0$ are not of equal lengths. The Skipjack cipher is an example of such a cipher. The Texas Instruments digital signature transponder uses a proprietary unbalanced Feistel cipher to perform challenge–response authentication.

The Thorp shuffle is an extreme case of an unbalanced Feistel cipher in which one side is a single bit. This has better provable security than a balanced Feistel cipher but requires more rounds.

There exist Type-1, Type-2, and Type-3 Feistel networks, where the Feistel function is one fourth the size of the block but operates a varying number of times within one round.

=== Other uses ===
The Feistel construction is also used in cryptographic algorithms other than block ciphers. For example, the optimal asymmetric encryption padding (OAEP) scheme uses a simple Feistel network to randomize ciphertexts in certain asymmetric-key encryption schemes.

A generalized Feistel algorithm can be used to create strong permutations on small domains of size not a power of two (see format-preserving encryption).

=== Feistel networks as a design component ===
Whether the entire cipher is a Feistel cipher or not, Feistel-like networks can be used as a component of a cipher's design. For example, MISTY1 is a Feistel cipher using a three-round Feistel network in its round function, Skipjack is a modified Feistel cipher using a Feistel network in its G permutation, and Threefish (part of Skein) is a non-Feistel block cipher that uses a Feistel-like MIX function.

== List of Feistel ciphers ==
Feistel or modified Feistel:

- Blowfish
- Camellia
- CAST-128
- DES
- FEAL
- GOST 28147-89
- ICE
- KASUMI
- LOKI97
- Lucifer
- MAGENTA
- MARS
- MISTY1
- RC5
- Simon
- TEA
- Triple DES
- Twofish
- XTEA

Generalised Feistel:

- CAST-256
- CLEFIA
- MacGuffin
- RC2
- RC6
- Skipjack
- SMS4

== See also ==
- Cryptography
- Stream cipher
- Substitution–permutation network
- Lifting scheme for discrete wavelet transform has pretty much the same structure
- Format-preserving encryption
- Lai–Massey scheme
