= Plaintext =

Unencrypted information

In cryptography, plaintext usually means unencrypted information pending input into cryptographic algorithms, usually encryption algorithms. This usually refers to data that is transmitted or stored unencrypted.

== Overview ==
With the advent of computing, the term plaintext expanded beyond human-readable documents to mean any data, including binary files, in a form that can be viewed or used without requiring a key or other decryption device. Information—a message, document, file, etc.—if to be communicated or stored in an unencrypted form is referred to as plaintext.

Plaintext is used as input to an encryption algorithm; the output is usually termed ciphertext, particularly when the algorithm is a cipher. Codetext is less often used, and almost always only when the algorithm involved is actually a code. Some systems use multiple layers of encryption, with the output of one encryption algorithm becoming "plaintext" input for the next.

== Secure handling ==
Insecure handling of plaintext can introduce weaknesses into a cryptosystem by letting an attacker bypass the cryptography altogether. Plaintext is vulnerable in use and in storage, whether in electronic or paper format. Physical security means the securing of information and its storage media from physical, attack—for instance by someone entering a building to access papers, storage media, or computers. Discarded material, if not disposed of securely, may be a security risk. Even shredded documents and erased magnetic media might be reconstructed with sufficient effort.

If plaintext is stored in a computer file, the storage media, the computer and its components, and all backups must be secure. Sensitive data is sometimes processed on computers whose mass storage is removable, in which case physical security of the removed disk is vital. In the case of securing a computer, useful (as opposed to handwaving) security must be physical (e.g., against burglary, brazen removal under cover of supposed repair, installation of covert monitoring devices, etc.), as well as virtual (e.g., operating system modification, illicit network access, Trojan programs). Wide availability of keydrives, which can plug into most modern computers and store large quantities of data, poses another severe security headache. A spy (perhaps posing as a cleaning person) could easily conceal one, and even swallow it if necessary.

Discarded computers, disk drives and media are also a potential source of plaintexts. Most operating systems do not actually erase anything— they simply mark the disk space occupied by a deleted file as 'available for use', and remove its entry from the file system directory. The information in a file deleted in this way remains fully present until overwritten at some later time when the operating system reuses the disk space. With even low-end computers commonly sold with many gigabytes of disk space and rising monthly, this 'later time' may be months later, or never. Even overwriting the portion of a disk surface occupied by a deleted file is insufficient in many cases. Peter Gutmann of the University of Auckland wrote a celebrated 1996 paper on the recovery of overwritten information from magnetic disks; areal storage densities have gotten much higher since then, so this sort of recovery is likely to be more difficult than it was when Gutmann wrote.

Modern hard drives automatically remap failing sectors, moving data to good sectors. This process makes information on those failing, excluded sectors invisible to the file system and normal applications. Special software, however, can still extract information from them.

Some government agencies (e.g., US NSA) require that personnel physically pulverize discarded disk drives and, in some cases, treat them with chemical corrosives. This practice is not widespread outside government, however. Garfinkel and Shelat (2003) analyzed 158 second-hand hard drives they acquired at garage sales and the like, and found that less than 10% had been sufficiently sanitized. The others contained a wide variety of readable personal and confidential information. See data remanence.

Physical loss is a serious problem. The US State Department, Department of Defense, and the British Secret Service have all had laptops with secret information, including in plaintext, lost or stolen. Appropriate disk encryption techniques can safeguard data on misappropriated computers or media.

On occasion, even when data on host systems is encrypted, media that personnel use to transfer data between systems is plaintext because of poorly designed data policy. For example, in October 2007, HM Revenue and Customs lost CDs that contained the unencrypted records of 25 million child benefit recipients in the United Kingdom.

Modern cryptographic systems resist known plaintext or even chosen plaintext attacks, and so may not be entirely compromised when plaintext is lost or stolen. Older systems resisted the effects of plaintext data loss on security with less effective techniques—such as padding and Russian copulation to obscure information in plaintext that could be easily guessed.

== See also ==
- Ciphertext
- Red/black concept
