= List of ISO standards 28000–29999 =

This is a list of published (Note: This list generally excludes draft versions.) International Organization for Standardization (ISO) standards and other deliverables. (Note: ISO deliverables include "specifications" (ISO/PAS, ISO/TS), "reports" (ISO/TR), etc, which are not referred to by ISO as "standards".) For a complete and up-to-date list of all the ISO standards, see the ISO catalogue.

The standards are protected by copyright and most of them must be purchased. However, about 300 of the standards produced by ISO and IEC's Joint Technical Committee 1 (JTC 1) have been made freely and publicly available.

== ISO 28000 – ISO 28999 ==
- ISO 28000:2007 Specification for security management systems for the supply chain
- ISO 28001:2007 Security management systems for the supply chain – Best practices for implementing supply chain security, assessments and plans – Requirements and guidance
- ISO 28002:2011 Security management systems for the supply chain – Development of resilience in the supply chain – Requirements with guidance for use
- ISO 28003:2007 Security management systems for the supply chain – Requirements for bodies providing audit and certification of supply chain security management systems
- ISO 28004 Security management systems for the supply chain – Guidelines for the implementation of ISO 28000
  - ISO 28004-1:2007 Part 1: General principles
  - ISO 28004-2:2014 Part 2: Guidelines for adopting ISO 28000 for use in medium and small seaport operations
  - ISO 28004-3:2014 Part 3: Additional specific guidance for adopting ISO 28000 for use by medium and small businesses (other than marine ports)
  - ISO 28004-4:2014 Part 4: Additional specific guidance on implementing ISO 28000 if compliance with ISO 28001 is a management objective
- ISO 28005 Security management systems for the supply chain – Electronic port clearance (EPC)
  - ISO 28005-1:2013 Part 1: Message structures
  - ISO 28005-2:2011 Part 2: Core data elements
- ISO/PAS 28007:2012 Ships and marine technology—Guidelines for Private Maritime Security Companies (PMSC) providing privately contracted armed security personnel (PCASP) on board ships (and pro forma contract) [Withdrawn: replaced by ISO 28007-1:2015]
- ISO 28007 Ships and marine technology - Guidelines for Private Maritime Security Companies (PMSC) providing privately contracted armed security personnel (PCASP) on board ships (and pro forma contract)
  - ISO 28007-1:2015 Part 1: General
- ISO/TS 28037:2010 Determination and use of straight-line calibration functions
- ISO/CIE 28077:2016 Photocarcinogenesis action spectrum (non-melanoma skin cancers)
- ISO/TR 28118:2009 Information and documentation - Performance indicators for national libraries
- ISO 28178:2009 Graphic technology - Exchange format for colour and process control data using XML or ASCII text
- ISO 28219:2009 Packaging - Labelling and direct product marking with linear bar code and two-dimensional symbols
- ISO 28238:2010 Compression and injection moulds - Components for gating systems
- ISO 28239:2008 Textile machinery – Opener and cleaner for staple fibres preparation – Vocabulary and principles of construction
- ISO 28300:2008 Petroleum, petrochemical and natural gas industries – Venting of atmospheric and low-pressure storage tanks
- ISO/IEC 28361:2007 Information technology – Telecommunications and information exchange between systems – Near Field Communication Wired Interface (NFC-WI)
- ISO/TR 28380 Health informatics – IHE global standards adoption
  - ISO/TR 28380-1:2014 Part 1: Process
  - ISO/TR 28380-2:2014 Part 2: Integration and content profiles
  - ISO/TR 28380-3:2014 Part 3: Deployment
- ISO 28401:2010 Light metals and their alloys – Titanium and titanium alloys – Classification and terminology
- ISO 28500:2017 Information and documentation - WARC file format
- ISO 28560 Information and documentation - RFID in libraries
  - ISO 28560-1:2014 Part 1: Data elements and general guidelines for implementation
  - ISO 28560-2:2014 Part 2: Encoding of RFID data elements based on rules from ISO/IEC 15962
  - ISO 28560-3:2014 Part 3: Fixed length encoding
  - ISO/TS 28560-4:2014 Part 4: Encoding of data elements based on rules from ISO/IEC 15962 in an RFID tag with partitioned memory
- ISO 28564 Public information guidance systems
  - ISO 28564-1:2010 Part 1: Design principles and element requirements for location plans, maps and diagrams
  - ISO 28564-2:2016 Part 2: Guidelines for the design and use of location signs and direction signs
- ISO 28620:2010 Medical devices – Non-electrically driven portable infusion devices
- ISO 28640:2010 Random variate generation methods
- ISO/TR 28682:2008 Intelligent transport systems – Joint APEC-ISO study of progress to develop and deploy ITS standards
- ISO 28801:2011 Double sampling plans by attributes with minimal sample sizes, indexed by producer's risk quality (PRQ) and consumer's risk quality (CRQ)
- ISO 28902 Air quality – Environmental meteorology
  - ISO 28902-1:2012 Part 1: Ground-based remote sensing of visual range by lidar
  - ISO 28902-2:2017 Part 2: Ground-based remote sensing of wind by heterodyne pulsed Doppler lidar
- ISO/TR 28980:2007 Ophthalmic optics – Spectacle lenses – Parameters affecting lens power measurement

== ISO 29000 – ISO 29999 ==
- ISO/TS 29001:2010 Petroleum, petrochemical and natural gas industries – Sector-specific quality management systems – Requirements for product and service supply organizations
- ISO/IEC 29100:2011 Information technology - Security techniques - Privacy framework
- ISO/IEC 29101:2013 Information technology - Security techniques - Privacy architecture framework
- ISO/IEC TR 29106:2007 Information technology - Generic cabling - Introduction to the MICE environmental classification
- ISO/IEC TR 29107 Information technology - Intelligent homes - Taxonomy of specifications
  - ISO/IEC TR 29107-1:2010 Part 1: The scheme
- ISO/IEC TR 29108:2013 Information technology - Terminology for intelligent homes
- ISO/IEC 29109 Information technology – Conformance testing methodology for biometric data interchange formats defined in ISO/IEC 19794
  - ISO/IEC 29109-1:2009 Part 1: Generalized conformance testing methodology
  - ISO/IEC 29109-2:2010 Part 2: Finger minutiae data
  - ISO/IEC 29109-4:2010 Part 4: Finger image data
  - ISO/IEC 29109-5:2014 Part 5: Face image data
  - ISO/IEC 29109-6:2011 Part 6: Iris image data
  - ISO/IEC 29109-7:2011 Part 7: Signature/sign time series data
  - ISO/IEC 29109-8:2011 Part 8: Finger pattern skeletal data
  - ISO/IEC 29109-9:2011 Part 9: Vascular image data
  - ISO/IEC 29109-10:2010 Part 10: Hand geometry silhouette data
- ISO/IEC 29110 Systems and software engineering - Lifecycle profiles for Very Small Entities (VSEs) (Note: The exact wording of this title varies between parts. This is the wording of the most recently published part.)
  - ISO/IEC TR 29110-1:2016 Part 1: Overview
  - ISO/IEC 29110-2-1:2015 Part 2-1: Framework and taxonomy
  - ISO/IEC TR 29110-2-2:2016 Part 2-2: Guide for the development of domain-specific profiles
  - ISO/IEC TR 29110-3-1:2015 Part 3-1: Assessment guide
  - ISO/IEC 29110-3-3:2016 Part 3-3: Certification requirements for conformity assessments of VSE profiles using process assessment and maturity models
  - ISO/IEC TR 29110-3-4:2015 Part 3-4: Autonomy-based improvement method
  - ISO/IEC 29110-4-1:2011 Part 4-1: Profile specifications: Generic profile group
  - ISO/IEC TR 29110-5-1-1:2012 Part 5-1-1: Management and engineering guide: Generic profile group: Entry profile
  - ISO/IEC TR 29110-5-1-2:2011 Part 5-1-2: Management and engineering guide: Generic profile group: Basic profile
  - ISO/IEC TR 29110-5-1-3:2017 Part 5-1-3: Software engineering - Management and engineering guide: Generic profile group - Intermediate profile
  - ISO/IEC TR 29110-5-2-1:2016 Part 5-2-1: Organizational management guidelines
  - ISO/IEC TR 29110-5-6-1:2015 Part 5-6-1: Systems engineering - Management and engineering guide: Generic profile group: Entry profile
  - ISO/IEC TR 29110-5-6-2:2014 Part 5-6-2: Systems engineering - Management and engineering guide: Generic profile group: Basic profile
- ISO/IEC TS 29113:2012 Information technology - Further interoperability of Fortran with C
- ISO/IEC 29115:2013 Information technology - Security techniques - Entity authentication assurance framework
- ISO/IEC 29119 Software and systems engineering – Software testing
- ISO/IEC 29120 Information technology – Machine readable test data for biometric testing and reporting
  - ISO/IEC 29120-1:2015 Part 1: Test reports
- ISO/IEC 29121:2013 Information technology - Digitally recorded media for information interchange and storage - Data migration method for DVD-R, DVD-RW, DVD-RAM, +R, and +RW disks
- ISO/IEC TR 29123:2007 Identification Cards – Proximity Cards – Requirements for the enhancement of interoperability
- ISO/IEC 29124:2010 Information technology - Programming languages, their environments and system software interfaces - Extensions to the C++ Library to support mathematical special functions
- ISO/IEC TS 29125:2017 Information technology - Telecommunications cabling requirements for remote powering of terminal equipment
- ISO/IEC TR 29127:2011 Information technology - System Process and Architecture for Multilingual Semantic Reverse Query Expansion
- ISO/IEC 29128:2011 Information technology - Security techniques - Verification of cryptographic protocols
- ISO/IEC 29133:2010 Information technology - Automatic identification and data capture techniques - Quality test specification for rewritable hybrid media data carriers
- ISO/IEC 29134:2017 Information technology - Security techniques - Guidelines for privacy impact assessment
- ISO/IEC 29136:2012 Information technology – User interfaces – Accessibility of personal computer hardware
- ISO/IEC TR 29138 Information technology – Accessibility considerations for people with disabilities
  - ISO/IEC TR 29138-1:2009 Part 1: User needs summary
  - ISO/IEC TR 29138-2:2009 Part 2: Standards inventory
  - ISO/IEC TR 29138-3:2009 Part 3: Guidance on user needs mapping
- ISO/IEC TS 29140 Information technology for learning, education and training - Nomadicity and mobile technologies
  - ISO/IEC TS 29140-1:2011 Part 1: Nomadicity reference model
  - ISO/IEC TS 29140-2:2011 Part 2: Learner information model for mobile learning
- ISO/IEC 29141:2009 Information technology – Biometrics – Tenprint capture using biometric application programming interface (BioAPI)
- ISO/IEC 29143:2011 Information technology - Automatic identification and data capture techniques - Air interface specification for Mobile RFID interrogators
- ISO/IEC TR 29144:2014 Information technology – Biometrics – The use of biometric technology in commercial Identity Management applications and processes
- ISO/IEC 29145 Information technology - Wireless Beacon-enabled Energy Efficient Mesh network (WiBEEM) for wireless home network services
  - ISO/IEC 29145-1:2014 Part 1: PHY Layer
  - ISO/IEC 29145-2:2014 Part 2: MAC Layer
  - ISO/IEC 29145-3:2014 Part 3: NWK Layer
- ISO/IEC 29146:2016 Information technology - Security techniques - A framework for access management
- ISO/IEC 29147:2014 Information technology - Security techniques - Vulnerability disclosure
- ISO/IEC/IEEE 29148:2011 Systems and software engineering - Life cycle processes - Requirements engineering
- ISO/IEC TR 29149:2012 Information technology - Security techniques - Best practices for the provision and use of time-stamping services
- ISO/IEC 29150:2011 Information technology - Security techniques - Signcryption
- ISO/IEC 29151:2017 Information technology - Security techniques - Code of practice for personally identifiable information protection
- ISO/IEC TR 29154:2013 Software engineering - Guide for the application of ISO/IEC 24773:2008 (Certification of software engineering professionals - Comparison framework)
- ISO/IEC 29155 Systems and software engineering - Information technology project performance benchmarking framework
  - ISO/IEC 29155-1:2017 Part 1: Concepts and definitions
  - ISO/IEC 29155-2:2013 Part 2: Requirements for benchmarking
  - ISO/IEC 29155-3:2015 Part 3: Guidance for reporting
  - ISO/IEC 29155-4:2016 Part 4: Guidance for data collection and maintenance
- ISO/IEC TR 29156:2015 Information technology – Guidance for specifying performance requirements to meet security and usability needs in applications using biometrics
- ISO/IEC 29157:2015 Information technology – Telecommunications and information exchange between systems – PHY/MAC specifications for short-range wireless low-rate applications in the ISM band
- ISO/IEC TR 29158:2011 Information technology - Automatic identification and data capture techniques - Direct Part Mark (DPM) Quality Guideline
- ISO/IEC 29159 Information technology – Biometric calibration, augmentation and fusion data
  - ISO/IEC 29159-1:2010 Part 1: Fusion information format
- ISO/IEC 29160:2012 Information technology - Radio frequency identification for item management - RFID Emblem
- ISO/IEC 29161:2016 Information technology - Data structure - Unique identification for the Internet of Things
- ISO/IEC TR 29162:2012 Information technology - Guidelines for using data structures in AIDC media
- ISO/IEC TR 29163 Information technology - Sharable Content Object Reference Model (SCORM®) 2004 3rd Edition
  - ISO/IEC TR 29163-1:2009 Part 1: Overview Version 1.1
  - ISO/IEC TR 29163-2:2009 Part 2: Content Aggregation Model Version 1.1
  - ISO/IEC TR 29163-3:2009 Part 3: Run-Time Environment Version 1.1
  - ISO/IEC TR 29163-4:2009 Part 4: Sequencing and Navigation Version 1.1
- ISO/IEC 29164:2011 Information technology – Biometrics – Embedded BioAPI
- ISO/IEC TR 29166:2011 Information technology - Document description and processing languages - Guidelines for translation between ISO/IEC 26300 and ISO/IEC 29500 document formats
- ISO/IEC 29167 Information technology - Automatic identification and data capture techniques
  - ISO/IEC 29167-1:2014 Part 1: Security services for RFID air interfaces
  - ISO/IEC 29167-10:2015 Part 10: Crypto suite AES-128 security services for air interface communications
  - ISO/IEC 29167-11:2014 Part 11: Crypto suite PRESENT-80 security services for air interface communications
  - ISO/IEC 29167-12:2015 Part 12: Crypto suite ECC-DH security services for air interface communications
  - ISO/IEC 29167-13:2015 Part 13: Crypto suite Grain-128A security services for air interface communications
  - ISO/IEC 29167-14:2015 Part 14: Crypto suite AES OFB security services for air interface communications
  - ISO/IEC 29167-16:2015 Part 16: Crypto suite ECDSA-ECDH security services for air interface communications
  - ISO/IEC 29167-17:2015 Part 17: Crypto suite cryptoGPS security services for air interface communications
  - ISO/IEC 29167-19:2016 Part 19: Crypto suite RAMON security services for air interface communications
  - ISO/IEC 29167-21:2018 Part 21: Crypto suite SIMON security services for air interface communications
  - ISO/IEC 29167-22:2018 Part 22: Crypto suite SPECK security services for air interface communications
- ISO/IEC 29168 Information technology - Open systems interconnection
  - ISO/IEC 29168-1:2011 Part 1: Object identifier resolution system
  - ISO/IEC 29168-2:2011 Part 2: Procedures for the object identifier resolution system operational agency
- ISO/IEC 29169:2016 Information technology - Process assessment - Application of conformity assessment methodology to the assessment to process quality characteristics and organizational maturity
- ISO/IEC 29170 Information technology - Advanced image coding and evaluation
  - ISO/IEC 29170-2:2015 Part 2: Evaluation procedure for nearly lossless coding
- ISO/IEC 29171:2009 Information technology - Digitally recorded media for information interchange and storage - Information Versatile Disk for Removable usage (iVDR) cartridge
- ISO/IEC TR 29172:2011 Information technology - Mobile item identification and management - Reference architecture for Mobile AIDC services
- ISO/IEC 29173 Information technology - Mobile item identification and management
  - ISO/IEC 29173-1:2012 Part 1: Mobile RFID interrogator device protocol for ISO/IEC 18000-63 Type C
- ISO/IEC 29175:2012 Information technology - Mobile item identification and management - User data for Mobile AIDC services
- ISO/IEC 29176:2011 Information technology - Mobile item identification and management - Consumer privacy-protection protocol for Mobile RFID services
- ISO/IEC 29177:2016 Information technology - Automatic identification and data capture technique - Identifier resolution protocol for multimedia information access triggered by tag-based identification
- ISO/IEC 29178:2012 Information technology - Mobile item identification and management - Service broker for Mobile AIDC services
- ISO/IEC 29179:2012 Information technology - Mobile item identification and management - Mobile AIDC application programming interface
- ISO/IEC 29180:2012 Information technology – Telecommunications and information exchange between systems – Security framework for ubiquitous sensor networks
- ISO/IEC TR 29181 Information technology – Future Network – Problem statement and requirements
  - ISO/IEC TR 29181-1:2012 Part 1: Overall aspects
  - ISO/IEC TR 29181-2:2014 Part 2: Naming and addressing
  - ISO/IEC TR 29181-3:2013 Part 3: Switching and routing
  - ISO/IEC TR 29181-4:2013 Part 4: Mobility
  - ISO/IEC TR 29181-5:2014 Part 5: Security
  - ISO/IEC TR 29181-6:2013 Part 6: Media transport
  - ISO/IEC TR 29181-7:2013 Part 7: Service composition
  - ISO/IEC TR 29181-8:2017 Part 8: Quality of Service
  - ISO/IEC TR 29181-9:2017 Part 9: Networking of everything
- ISO/IEC 29182 Information technology – Sensor networks: Sensor Network Reference Architecture (SNRA)
  - ISO/IEC 29182-1:2013 Part 1: General overview and requirements
  - ISO/IEC 29182-2:2013 Part 2: Vocabulary and terminology
  - ISO/IEC 29182-3:2014 Part 3: Reference architecture views
  - ISO/IEC 29182-4:2013 Part 4: Entity models
  - ISO/IEC 29182-5:2013 Part 5: Interface definitions
  - ISO/IEC 29182-6:2014 Part 6: Applications
  - ISO/IEC 29182-7:2015 Part 7: Interoperability guidelines
- ISO/IEC 29187 Information technology - Identification of privacy protection requirements pertaining to learning, education and training (LET)
  - ISO/IEC 29187-1:2013 Part 1: Framework and reference model
- ISO/IEC TR 29189:2015 Information technology – Biometrics – Evaluation of examiner assisted biometric applications
- ISO/IEC 29190:2015 Information technology - Security techniques - Privacy capability assessment model
- ISO/IEC 29191:2012 Information technology - Security techniques - Requirements for partially anonymous, partially unlinkable authentication.
- ISO/IEC 29192 Information technology - Security techniques - Lightweight cryptography
  - ISO/IEC 29192-1:2012 Part 1: General
  - ISO/IEC 29192-2:2012 Part 2: Block ciphers
  - ISO/IEC 29192-3:2012 Part 3: Stream ciphers
  - ISO/IEC 29192-4:2013 Part 4: Mechanisms using asymmetric techniques
  - ISO/IEC 29192-5:2016 Part 5: Hash-functions
  - ISO/IEC 29192-6:2016 Part 6: Message authentication codes (MACs)
  - ISO/IEC 29192-7:2016 Part 7: Broadcast authentication protocols
- ISO/IEC TR 29194:2015 Information Technology – Biometrics – Guide on designing accessible and inclusive biometric systems
- ISO/IEC TR 29195:2015 Traveller processes for biometric recognition in automated border control systems
- ISO/IEC TR 29196:2015 Guidance for biometric enrolment
- ISO/IEC 29197:2015 Information technology - Evaluation methodology for environmental influence in biometric system performance
- ISO/IEC TR 29198:2013 Information technology – Biometrics – Characterization and measurement of difficulty for fingerprint databases for technology evaluation
- ISO/IEC 29199 Information technology - JPEG XR image coding system
  - ISO/IEC TR 29199-1:2011 Part 1: System architecture
  - ISO/IEC 29199-2:2012 Part 2: Image coding specification
  - ISO/IEC 29199-3:2010 Part 3: Motion JPEG XR
  - ISO/IEC 29199-4:2010 Part 4: Conformance testing
  - ISO/IEC 29199-5:2012 Part 5: Reference software
- ISO 29281 Intelligent transport systems – Communication access for land mobiles (CALM) – Non-IP networking
  - ISO 29281-1:2013 Part 1: Fast networking & transport layer protocol (FNTP)
  - ISO 29281-2:2013 Part 2: Legacy system support
- ISO 29282:2011 Intelligent transport systems – Communications access for land mobiles (CALM) – Satellite networks
- ISO 29283:2011 ITS CALM Mobile Wireless Broadband applications using Communications in accordance with IEEE 802.20
- ISO/TS 29284:2012 Intelligent transport systems – Event-based probe vehicle data
- ISO/IEC 29341 Information technology - UPnP Device Architecture
  - ISO/IEC 29341-1:2011 Part 1: UPnP Device Architecture Version 1.0
  - ISO/IEC 29341-1-1:2011 Part 1-1: UPnP Device Architecture Version 1.1
  - ISO/IEC 29341-1-2:2017 Part 1-2: UPnP Device Architecture Version 2.0
  - ISO/IEC 29341-2:2008 Part 2: Basic Device Control Protocol - Basic Device
  - ISO/IEC 29341-3-1:2011 Part 3-1: Audio Video Device Control Protocol - Audio Video Architecture
  - ISO/IEC 29341-3-2:2008 Part 3-2: Audio Video Device Control Protocol - Media Renderer Device
  - ISO/IEC 29341-3-3:2008 Part 3-3: Audio Video Device Control Protocol - Media Server Device
  - ISO/IEC 29341-3-10:2015 Part 3-10: Audio Video Device Control Protocol - Audio Video Transport Service
  - ISO/IEC 29341-3-11:2008 Part 3-11: Audio Video Device Control Protocol - Connection Manager Service
  - ISO/IEC 29341-3-12:2008 Part 3-12: Audio Video Device Control Protocol - Content Directory Service
  - ISO/IEC 29341-3-13:2008 Part 3-13: Audio Video Device Control Protocol - Rendering Control Service
  - ISO/IEC 29341-4-2:2011 Part 4-2: Audio Video Device Control Protocol - Level 2 - Media Renderer Device
  - ISO/IEC 29341-4-3:2008 Part 4-3: Audio Video Device Control Protocol - Level 2 - Media Server Device
  - ISO/IEC 29341-4-4:2011 Part 4-4: Audio Video Device Control Protocol - Level 2 - Audio Video Data Structures
  - ISO/IEC 29341-4-10:2011 Part 4-10: Audio Video Device Control Protocol - Level 2 - Audio Video Transport Service
  - ISO/IEC 29341-4-11:2011 Part 4-11: Audio Video Device Control Protocol - Level 2 - Connection Manager Service
  - ISO/IEC 29341-4-12:2008 Part 4-12: Audio Video Device Control Protocol - Level 2 - Content Directory Service
  - ISO/IEC 29341-4-13:2011 Part 4-13: Audio Video Device Control Protocol - Level 2 - Rendering Control Service
  - ISO/IEC 29341-4-14:2011 Part 4-14: Audio Video Device Control Protocol - Level 2 - Scheduled Recording Service
  - ISO/IEC 29341-5-1:2008 Part 5-1: Digital Security Camera Device Control Protocol - Digital Security Camera Device
  - ISO/IEC 29341-5-10:2008 Part 5-10: Digital Security Camera Device Control Protocol - Digital Security Camera Motion Image Service
  - ISO/IEC 29341-5-11:2008 Part 5-11: Digital Security Camera Device Control Protocol - Digital Security Camera Settings Service
  - ISO/IEC 29341-5-12:2008 Part 5-12: Digital Security Camera Device Control Protocol - Digital Security Camera Still Image Service
  - ISO/IEC 29341-6-1:2008 Part 6-1: Heating, Ventilation, and Air Conditioning Device Control Protocol - System Device
  - ISO/IEC 29341-6-2:2008 Part 6-2: Heating, Ventilation, and Air Conditioning Device Control Protocol - Zone Thermostat Device
  - ISO/IEC 29341-6-10:2008 Part 6-10: Heating, Ventilation, and Air Conditioning Device Control Protocol - Control Valve Service
  - ISO/IEC 29341-6-11:2008 Part 6-11: Heating, Ventilation, and Air Conditioning Device Control Protocol - Fan Operating Mode Service
  - ISO/IEC 29341-6-12:2008 Part 6-12: Heating, Ventilation, and Air Conditioning Device Control Protocol - Fan Speed Service
  - ISO/IEC 29341-6-13:2008 Part 6-13: Heating, Ventilation, and Air Conditioning Device Control Protocol - House Status Service
  - ISO/IEC 29341-6-14:2008 Part 6-14: Heating, Ventilation, and Air Conditioning Device Control Protocol - Setpoint Schedule Service
  - ISO/IEC 29341-6-15:2008 Part 6-15: Heating, Ventilation, and Air Conditioning Device Control Protocol - Temperature Sensor Service
  - ISO/IEC 29341-6-16:2008 Part 6-16: Heating, Ventilation, and Air Conditioning Device Control Protocol - Temperature Setpoint Service
  - ISO/IEC 29341-6-17:2008 Part 6-17: Heating, Ventilation, and Air Conditioning Device Control Protocol - User Operating Mode Service
  - ISO/IEC 29341-7-1:2008 Part 7-1: Lighting Device Control Protocol - Binary Light Device
  - ISO/IEC 29341-7-2:2008 Part 7-2: Lighting Device Control Protocol - Dimmable Light Device
  - ISO/IEC 29341-7-10:2008 Part 7-10: Lighting Device Control Protocol - Dimming Service
  - ISO/IEC 29341-7-11:2015 Part 7-11: Lighting Device Control Protocol - Switch Power Service
  - ISO/IEC 29341-8-1:2008 Part 8-1: Internet Gateway Device Control Protocol - Internet Gateway Device
  - ISO/IEC 29341-8-2:2008 Part 8-2: Internet Gateway Device Control Protocol - Local Area Network Device
  - ISO/IEC 29341-8-3:2008 Part 8-3: Internet Gateway Device Control Protocol - Wide Area Network Device
  - ISO/IEC 29341-8-4:2008 Part 8-4: Internet Gateway Device Control Protocol - Wide Area Network Connection Device
  - ISO/IEC 29341-8-5:2008 Part 8-5: Internet Gateway Device Control Protocol - Wireless Local Area Network Access Point Device
  - ISO/IEC 29341-8-10:2008 Part 8-10: Internet Gateway Device Control Protocol - Local Area Network Host Configuration Management Service
  - ISO/IEC 29341-8-11:2008 Part 8-11: Internet Gateway Device Control Protocol - Layer 3 Forwarding Service
  - ISO/IEC 29341-8-12:2008 Part 8-12: Internet Gateway Device Control Protocol - Link Authentication Service
  - ISO/IEC 29341-8-13:2008 Part 8-13: Internet Gateway Device Control Protocol - Radius Client Service
  - ISO/IEC 29341-8-14:2008 Part 8-14: Internet Gateway Device Control Protocol - Wide Area Network Cable Link Configuration Service
  - ISO/IEC 29341-8-15:2008 Part 8-15: Internet Gateway Device Control Protocol - Wide Area Network Common Interface Configuration Service
  - ISO/IEC 29341-8-16:2008 Part 8-16: Internet Gateway Device Control Protocol - Wide Area Network Digital Subscriber Line Configuration Service
  - ISO/IEC 29341-8-17:2008 Part 8-17: Internet Gateway Device Control Protocol - Wide Area Network Ethernet Link Configuration Service
  - ISO/IEC 29341-8-18:2008 Part 8-18: Internet Gateway Device Control Protocol - Wide Area Network Internet Protocol Connection Service
  - ISO/IEC 29341-8-19:2008 Part 8-19: Internet Gateway Device Control Protocol - Wide Area Network Plain Old Telephone Service Link Configuration Service
  - ISO/IEC 29341-8-20:2008 Part 8-20: Internet Gateway Device Control Protocol - Wide Area Network Point-to-Point Protocol Connection Service
  - ISO/IEC 29341-8-21:2008 Part 8-21: Internet Gateway Device Control Protocol - Wireless Local Area Network Configuration Service
  - ISO/IEC 29341-9-1:2008 Part 9-1: Imaging Device Control Protocol - Printer Device
  - ISO/IEC 29341-9-2:2008 Part 9-2: Imaging Device Control Protocol - Scanner
  - ISO/IEC 29341-9-10:2008 Part 9-10: Imaging Device Control Protocol - External Activity Service
  - ISO/IEC 29341-9-11:2008 Part 9-11: Imaging Device Control Protocol - Feeder Service
  - ISO/IEC 29341-9-12:2008 Part 9-12: Imaging Device Control Protocol - Print Basic Service
  - ISO/IEC 29341-9-13:2008 Part 9-13: Imaging Device Control Protocol - Scan Service
  - ISO/IEC 29341-10-1:2008 Part 10-1: Quality of Service Device Control Protocol - Quality of Service Architecture
  - ISO/IEC 29341-10-10:2008 Part 10-10: Quality of Service Device Control Protocol - Quality of Service Device
  - ISO/IEC 29341-10-11:2008 Part 10-11: Quality of Service Device Control Protocol - Quality of Service Manager Service
  - ISO/IEC 29341-10-12:2008 Part 10-12: Quality of Service Device Control Protocol - Quality of Service Policy Holder Service
  - ISO/IEC 29341-11-1:2008 Part 11-1: Quality of Service Device Control Protocol - Level 2 - Quality of Service Architecture
  - ISO/IEC 29341-11-2:2008 Part 11-2: Quality of Service Device Control Protocol - Level 2 - Quality of Service Schemas
  - ISO/IEC 29341-11-10:2008 Part 11-10: Quality of Service Device Control Protocol - Level 2 - Quality of Service Device Service
  - ISO/IEC 29341-11-11:2008 Part 11-11: Quality of Service Device Control Protocol - Level 2 - Quality of Service Manager Service
  - ISO/IEC 29341-11-12:2008 Part 11-12: Quality of Service Device Control Protocol - Level 2 - Quality of Service Policy Holder Service
  - ISO/IEC 29341-12-1:2015 Part 12-1: Remote User Interface Device Control Protocol - Remote User Interface Client Device
  - ISO/IEC 29341-12-2:2015 Part 12-2: Remote User Interface Device Control Protocol - Remote User Interface Server Device
  - ISO/IEC 29341-12-10:2015 Part 12-10: Remote User Interface Device Control Protocol - Remote User Interface Client Service
  - ISO/IEC 29341-12-11:2015 Part 12-11: Remote User Interface Device Control Protocol - Remote User Interface Server Service
  - ISO/IEC 29341-13-10:2008 Part 13-10: Device Security Device Control Protocol - Device Security Service
  - ISO/IEC 29341-13-11:2008 Part 13-11: Device Security Device Control Protocol - Security Console Service
  - ISO/IEC 29341-14-3:2011 Part 14-3: Audio Video Device Control Protocol - Level 3 - Media Server Device
  - ISO/IEC 29341-14-12:2011 Part 14-12: Audio Video Device Control Protocol - Level 3 - Audio Video Content Directory Service
  - ISO/IEC 29341-15-10:2011 Part 15-10: Content Synchronization Device Control Protocol - Content Synchronization Service
  - ISO/IEC 29341-16-1:2011 Part 16-1: Low Power Device Control Protocol - Low Power
  - ISO/IEC 29341-16-10:2011 Part 16-10: Low Power Device Control Protocol - Low Power Proxy Service
  - ISO/IEC 29341-16-11:2011 Part 16-11: Low Power Device Control Protocol - Low Power Service
  - ISO/IEC 29341-17-1:2011 Part 17-1: Quality of Service Device Control Protocol - Level 3 - Quality of Service Architecture
  - ISO/IEC 29341-17-10:2011 Part 17-10: Quality of Service Device Control Protocol - Level 3 - Quality of Service Device Service
  - ISO/IEC 29341-17-11:2011 Part 17-11: Quality of Service Device Control Protocol - Level 3 - Quality of Service Manager Service
  - ISO/IEC 29341-17-12:2011 Part 17-12: Quality of Service Device Control Protocol - Level 3 - Quality of Service Policy Holder Service
  - ISO/IEC 29341-17-13:2011 Part 17-13: Quality of Service Device Control Protocol - Level 3 - Quality of Service Device Service - Underlying Technology Interfaces
  - ISO/IEC 29341-18-1:2011 Part 18-1: Remote Access Device Control Protocol - Remote Access Architecture
  - ISO/IEC 29341-18-2:2011 Part 18-2: Remote Access Device Control Protocol - Remote Access Client Device
  - ISO/IEC 29341-18-3:2011 Part 18-3: Remote Access Device Control Protocol - Remote Access Server Device
  - ISO/IEC 29341-18-4:2011 Part 18-4: Remote Access Device Control Protocol - Remote Access Discovery Agent Device
  - ISO/IEC 29341-18-10:2011 Part 18-10: Remote Access Device Control Protocol - Remote Access Inbound Connection Configuration Service
  - ISO/IEC 29341-18-11:2011 Part 18-11: Remote Access Device Control Protocol - Remote Access Discovery Agent Service
  - ISO/IEC 29341-18-12:2011 Part 18-12: Remote Access Device Control Protocol - Remote Access Discovery Agent Synchronization Service
  - ISO/IEC 29341-18-13:2011 Part 18-13: Remote Access Device Control Protocol - Remote Access Transport Agent Configuration Service
  - ISO/IEC 29341-19-1:2011 Part 19-1: Solar Protection Blind Device Control Protocol - Solar Protection Blind Device
  - ISO/IEC 29341-19-10:2011 Part 19-10: Solar Protection Blind Device Control Protocol - Two Way Motion Motor Service
  - ISO/IEC 29341-30-1:2017 Part 30-1: IoT management and control device control protocol - IoT management and control architecture overview
  - ISO/IEC 29341-30-2:2017 Part 30-2: IoT management and control device control protocol - IoT management and control device
  - ISO/IEC 29341-30-10:2017 Part 30-10: IoT management and control device control protocol - Data store service
  - ISO/IEC 29341-30-11:2017 Part 30-11: IoT management and control device control protocol - IoT management and control data model service
  - ISO/IEC 29341-30-12:2017 Part 30-12: IoT management and control device control protocol - IoT management and control transport generic service
- ISO/IEC 29361:2008 Information technology – Web Services Interoperability – WS-I Basic Profile Version 1.1
- ISO/IEC 29362:2008 Information technology – Web Services Interoperability – WS-I Attachments Profile Version 1.0
- ISO/IEC 29363:2008 Information technology – Web Services Interoperability – WS-I Simple SOAP Binding Profile Version 1.0
- ISO 29383:2020 Terminology policies — Development and implementation
- ISO 29404:2015 Ships and marine technology - Offshore wind energy - Supply chain information flow
- ISO 29461 Air intake filter systems for rotary machinery – Test methods
  - ISO 29461-1:2013 Part 1: Static filter elements
- ISO 29464:2017 Cleaning of air and other gases – Terminology
- ISO/IEC 29500 Information technology – Document description and processing languages – Office Open XML File Formats
  - ISO/IEC 29500-1:2016 Part 1: Fundamentals and Markup Language Reference
  - ISO/IEC 29500-2:2012 Part 2: Open Packaging Conventions
  - ISO/IEC 29500-3:2015 Part 3: Markup Compatibility and Extensibility
  - ISO/IEC 29500-4:2016 Part 4: Transitional Migration Features
- ISO/TS 29585:2010 Health informatics – Deployment of a clinical data warehouse
- ISO 29621:2017 Cosmetics – Microbiology – Guidelines for the risk assessment and identification of microbiologically low-risk products
- ISO/IEC 29642:2009 Information technology - Data interchange on 120 mm and 80 mm optical disk using +RW DL format - Capacity: 8,55 Gbytes and 2,66 Gbytes per side (recording speed 2,4X)
- ISO 29701:2010 Nanotechnologies – Endotoxin test on nanomaterial samples for in vitro systems – Limulus amebocyte lysate (LAL) test
- ISO 29781:2008 Prostheses and orthoses – Factors to be included when describing physical activity of a person who has had a lower limb amputation(s) or who has a deficiency of a lower limb segment(s) present at birth
- ISO 29782:2008 Prostheses and orthoses – Factors to be considered when specifying a prosthesis for a person who has had a lower limb amputation
- ISO 29783 Prosthetics and orthotics - Vocabulary
  - ISO 29783-1:2008 Part 1: Normal gait
  - ISO 29783-2:2015 Part 2: Prosthetic gait
  - ISO 29783-3:2016 Part 3: Pathological gait (excluding prosthetic gait)
- ISO/IEC 29794 Information technology – Biometric sample quality
  - ISO/IEC 29794-1:2016 Part 1: Framework
  - ISO/IEC 29794-4:2017 Part 4: Finger image data
  - ISO/IEC TR 29794-5:2010 Part 5: Face image data
  - ISO/IEC 29794-6:2015 Part 6: Iris image data
- ISO 29821 Condition monitoring and diagnostics of machines – Ultrasound
  - ISO 29821-1:2011 Part 1: General guidelines
  - ISO 29821-2:2016 Part 2: Procedures and validation
- ISO 29845:2011 Technical product documentation – Document types
- ISO/IEC 29881:2010 Information technology - Systems and software engineering - FiSMA 1.1 functional size measurement method
- ISO/TR 29901:2007 Selected illustrations of full factorial experiments with four factors
- ISO 29990:2010 Learning services for non-formal education and training – Basic requirements for service providers
- ISO 29991:2014 Language learning services outside formal education – Requirements
- ISO 29993:2017 Learning services outside formal education – Service requirements
