= Ascon (cipher) =

Family of authenticated ciphers

General
- Designers: C. Dobraunig, M. Eichlseder, F. Mendel, M. Schläffer
- First published: 2014

Cipher detail
- Key sizes: up to 128, 128 bits are recommended
- Block sizes: up to 128 bits, 128 and 64 bits are recommended
- Structure: sponge construction
- Rounds: 6–8 rounds per input word recommended

Ascon is a family of lightweight authenticated ciphers and hash functions that have been selected by the U.S. National Institute of Standards and Technology (NIST) for cryptography on resource-constrained devices in 2025, specified in NIST SP 800-232.

== History ==
Ascon was developed in 2014 by a team of researchers from Graz University of Technology, Infineon Technologies, Lamarr Security Research, and Radboud University. The cipher family was chosen as a finalist of the CAESAR Competition in February 2019.

NIST announced its decision on February 7, 2023 with the following steps that lead to its standardization:

- Publication of NIST IR 8454 describing the process of evaluation and selection that was used;
- Preparation of a new draft for public comments;
- Public workshop held on June 21–22, 2023.

NIST finalized the standard on August 13, 2025, releasing it as "Ascon-Based Lightweight Cryptography Standards for Constrained Devices" (NIST Special Publication 800-232).

== Design ==
The design is based on a sponge construction along the lines of SpongeWrap and MonkeyDuplex. This design makes it easy to reuse Ascon in multiple ways (as a cipher, hash, or a MAC). As of February 2023, the Ascon suite contained seven ciphers, including:

- Ascon-128 and Ascon-128a authenticated ciphers;
- Ascon-Hash cryptographic hash;
- Ascon-Xof extendable-output function;
- Ascon-80pq cipher with an "increased" 160-bit key.

The main components have been borrowed from other designs:

- substitution layer utilizes a modified S-box from the χ function of Keccak;
- permutation layer functions are similar to the $\Sigma$ of SHA-2.

=== Parameterization ===
The ciphers are parameterizable by the key length k (up to 128 bits), "rate" (block size) r, and two numbers of rounds a, b. All algorithms support authenticated encryption with plaintext P and additional authenticated data A (that remains unencrypted). The encryption input also includes a public nonce N, the output - authentication tag T, size of the ciphertext C is the same as that of P. The decryption uses N, A, C, and T as inputs and produces either P or signals verification failure if the message has been altered. Nonce and tag have the same size as the key K (k bits).

In the CAESAR submission, two sets of parameters were recommended:

Suggested parameters, bits
Name	k	r	a	b
Ascon-128	128	64	12	6
Ascon-128a	128	128	12	8

=== Padding ===
The data in both A and P is padded with a single bit with the value of 1 and a number of zeros to the nearest multiple of r bits. As an exception, if A is an empty string, there is no padding at all.

=== State ===
The state consists of 320 bits, so the capacity $c=320-r$. The state is initialized by an initialization vector IV (constant for each cipher type, e.g., hex 80400c0600000000 for Ascon-128) concatenated with K and N.

=== Transformation ===
The initial state is transformed by applying a times the transformation function p ($p^a$). On encryption, each word of A || P is XORed into the state and the p is applied b times ($p^b$). The ciphertext C is contained in the first r bits of the result of the XOR. Decryption is near-identical to encryption. The final stage that produces the tag T consists of another application of $p^a$; the special values are XORed into the last c bits after the initialization, the end of A, and before the finalization.

Transformation p consists of three layers:

- $p_C$, XORing the round constants;
- $p_S$, application of 5-bit S-boxes;
- $p_L$, application of linear diffusion.

== See also ==
- CAESAR Competition
- Simon and Speck, earlier lightweight cipher families released by the U.S. National Security Agency

== Sources ==
- NIST (SP 800-232), "Ascon-Based Lightweight Cryptography Standards for Constrained Devices: Authenticated Encryption, Hash, and Extendable Output Functions" , nist.gov, National Institute of Standards and Technology
- NIST (2023a). "Lightweight Cryptography Standardization Process: NIST Selects Ascon". nist.gov. National Institute of Standards and Technology.
- NIST (2023b). "NIST Selects 'Lightweight Cryptography' Algorithms to Protect Small Devices". nist.gov. National Institute of Standards and Technology.
- Dobraunig, Christoph; Eichlseder, Maria; Mendel, Florian; Schläffer, Martin (2016). "Ascon v1.2: Submission to the CAESAR Competition" (PDF). nist.gov. National Institute of Standards and Technology.
- Dobraunig, Christoph; Eichlseder, Maria; Mendel, Florian; Schläffer, Martin (22 June 2021). "Ascon v1.2: Lightweight Authenticated Encryption and Hashing". Journal of Cryptology. 34 (3) 33. doi:10.1007/s00145-021-09398-9. eISSN 1432-1378. hdl:2066/235128. ISSN 0933-2790. S2CID 253633576.
