= Delinea =

US cyber security company

- Type: Private
- Industry: Cybersecurity
- Founded: 2021
- Headquarters: San Francisco, California, United States
- Area served: Worldwide
- Key people: Art Gilliland; Chris Kelly
- Website: www.delinea.com

Delinea is an American cybersecurity company specializing in privileged access management and identity security.

== History ==
Delinea was formed in April 2021 through the merger of Thycotic Software Ltd. and Centrify Corp. under TPG Capital ownership. Centrify was originally founded in 2004 by Tom Kemp as a privileged access management provider. Following the 2021 merger, Delinea initially focused on combining the legacy privileged access management solutions from Thycotic and Centrify into a unified platform.

On February 1, 2022, TPG Capital rebranded the company as "Delinea Inc." to emphasize its shift toward cloud privileged access solutions for hybrid environments. By February 2023, Delinea reported annualized recurring revenue exceeding $250 million. On January 9, 2024, Delinea acquired the Israel-based cybersecurity startup Authomize Ltd. and, also closed on the acquisition of Fastpath, an identity governance and administration company, in April 2024. On August 5, 2025, Delinea launched "Iris AI", an artificial intelligence engine integrated into its platform for real-time access decisions and auditing.

In January 2026, Delinea announced the acquisition of StrongDM and, closed on the acquisition in March of 2026.

== Software ==
Delinea developed a cloud platform for identity security for human, machine, and AI agent identities. The company claims to be able to prevent identity-based attacks using identity discovery and inventory, governance across hybrid environments, continuous threat detection paired with threat analysis, and enforcement of access controls at the moment of action.

Secret Server anchors the offering as a credentials vault focused on privileged access management. It delivers enterprise password management via secure credentials, vaulting, automated handling of enterprise passwords, session monitoring, and full auditing capabilities.

The wider Delinea Platform builds on this foundation with just-in-time authorization, continuously enforced, alongside runtime authorization, Zero Standing Privilege, and privileged elevation and delegation. Identity governance and compliance features support segregation of duties and user access reviews, while Delinea Iris AI advances AI agent security by applying adaptive controls, anomaly detection, and intelligent auditing to safeguard AI agents.

=== See also ===
- Computer security
- Privileged access management

== Links ==
- Official Website
