= StrongDM =

American technology company

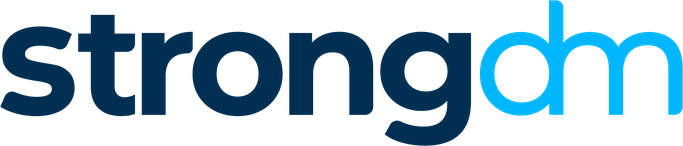
- Industry: Software, Remote Management
- Founders: Schuyler Brown, Elizabeth Zalman, Justin McCarthy
- Key people: Tim Prendergast (CEO); Amol Kabe (CPO); Justin McCarthy (CTO)
- Products: Privileged Access Manager
- Number of employees: 94
- Website: strongdm.com

StrongDM is an American technology company that develops an infrastructure access platform. In 2026, the company was acquired by Delinea.

== History ==
StrongDM was founded in 2015 by Elizabeth Zalman, Justin McCarthy, and Schuyler Brown. The company was one of the first female led startups backed by Hearst's initiative to invest in women led startups. In 2024, the company raised US$34,000,000 in their Series C round from Capital One Ventures, Cisco Investments, Frontline Ventures, and Singtel Innov8s.

StrongDM was acquired by Delinea in March of 2026.

== Software ==
The software is a Zero Trust Privileged Access Management for aggregating secure access and permissions. It centralizes backend infrastructure access for legacy or multi-cloud environments. The software also integrates with identity providers, secret stores, and SIEM tools.

The platform provides and manages user access to backend infrastructure like serves and databases, and logs user actions in video replay.
