= IVDR =

Portable HDD cartridge standard

iVDR, or Information Versatile Disk for Removable usage, is a portable HDD cartridge standard.

The standard is managed by the iVDR Hard Disk Drive Consortium, which consists largely of Japanese corporations. It provides the benefits of HDD technology, while going against the trend of smaller storage formats. Transfer speeds are up to 1.5 Gbit/s over SATA. Size ranges from the larger iVDR (80 mm x 110 mm) to the smaller iVDR micro (50mm x 50mm). It was born of the increasing need for large-capacity media that can store increasing amounts of high-quality video and image data, high-quality audio data, and so on.

== Sources ==
- C|Net article
- PC World article Retrieved from the Internet Archive on March 18, 2016.
