= Cryptographic anchor =

Cryptography concept

A cryptographic anchor refers to binding digital objects together using cryptographic techniques, such as cryptographic hashing or digital signatures. This data can be used to verify an object is authentic for traceability and fraud detection, while the cryptography provides tamperproofing. For example, this might be creating a digital identifier system that can be put into physical products to verify their origin, or attaching identifying or supplemental data to a blockchain.

== IBM application ==
IBM has worked on developing cryptographic anchors. Proposed uses include labeling a pill (the code for the dye would become visible when touched with water) and marking fluids. The reason for using these anchors is to ensure the authenticity of products. The suggested cost of these tiny (smaller than a salt grain) items was projected at less than ten U.S. cents.

According to journalist Giulio Prisco, "The cryptographic anchors project is considered a starting point for developing technologies complementary to the Internet of Things (IoT) ... able to provide scalable end-to-end security across a supply chain — from the manufacturers right down to consumers and patients. A typical application envisioned by IBM is fighting product fraud. IBM’s crypto-anchors can authenticate a product’s origin and contents, ensuring it matches the record stored in the blockchain."
