= CAESAR Competition =

Competition to design encryption schemes

The Competition for Authenticated Encryption: Security, Applicability, and Robustness (CAESAR) is a competition organized by a group of international cryptologic researchers to encourage the design of authenticated encryption schemes. The competition was announced at the Early Symmetric Crypto workshop in January 2013 and the final portfolio in February 2019.

== Use Cases ==
The final CAESAR portfolio is organized into three use cases:

- 1: Lightweight applications (resource constrained environments)
- 2: High-performance applications
- 3: Defense in depth

== Final Portfolio ==
The final portfolio announced by the CAESAR committee is:

| Use Case 1 (Lightweight applications) | Use Case 2 (High-performance applications) | Use Case 3 (Defense in depth) |
|---|---|---|
| Ascon | AEGIS-128 | Deoxys-II |
| ACORN | OCB | COLM |

== CAESAR committee ==
The committee in charge of the CAESAR Competition consisted of:

- Steve Babbage (Vodafone Group, UK)
- Daniel J. Bernstein (University of Illinois at Chicago, USA, and Technische Universiteit Eindhoven, Netherlands); secretary, non-voting
- Alex Biryukov (University of Luxembourg, Luxembourg)
- Anne Canteaut (Inria Paris-Rocquencourt, France)
- Carlos Cid (Royal Holloway, University of London, UK)
- Joan Daemen (STMicroelectronics, Belgium)
- Orr Dunkelman (University of Haifa, Israel)
- Henri Gilbert (ANSSI, France)
- Tetsu Iwata (Nagoya University, Japan)
- Stefan Lucks (Bauhaus-Universität Weimar, Germany)
- Willi Meier (FHNW, Switzerland)
- Bart Preneel (COSIC, KU Leuven, Belgium)
- Vincent Rijmen (KU Leuven, Belgium)
- Matt Robshaw (Impinj, USA)
- Phillip Rogaway (University of California at Davis, USA)
- Greg Rose (kitchen4140, USA)
- Serge Vaudenay (EPFL, Switzerland)
- Hongjun Wu (Nanyang Technological University, Singapore)
