= Simon (cipher) =

Family of lightweight block ciphers

- One round of Simon

General
- Designers: Ray Beaulieu, Douglas Shors, Jason Smith, Stefan Treatman-Clark, Bryan Weeks, Louis Wingers NSA
- First published: 2013
- Related to: Speck

Cipher detail
- Key sizes: 64, 72, 96, 128, 144, 192 or 256 bits
- Block sizes: 32, 48, 64, 96 or 128 bits
- Structure: Balanced Feistel network
- Rounds: 32, 36, 42, 44, 52, 54, 68, 69 or 72 (depending on block and key size)
- Speed: 7.5 cpb (21.6 without SSE) on Intel Xeon 5640 (Simon128/128)

Best public cryptanalysis
- Differential cryptanalysis can break 46 rounds of Simon128/128 with 2^{125.6} data, 2^{40.6} bytes memory and time complexity of 2^{125.7} with success rate of 0.632.

Simon is a family of lightweight block ciphers publicly released by the National Security Agency (NSA) in June 2013. Simon has been optimized for performance in hardware implementations, while its sister algorithm, Speck, has been optimized for software implementations.

The NSA began working on the Simon and Speck ciphers in 2011. The agency anticipated some agencies in the US federal government would need a cipher that would operate well on a diverse collection of Internet of Things devices while maintaining an acceptable level of security.

== Description of the cipher ==
The Simon block cipher is a balanced Feistel cipher with an n-bit word, and therefore the block length is 2n. The key length is a multiple of n by 2, 3, or 4, which is the value m. Therefore, a Simon cipher implementation is denoted as Simon2n/nm. For example, Simon64/128 refers to the cipher operating on a 64-bit plaintext block (n = 32) that uses a 128-bit key. The block component of the cipher is uniform between the Simon implementations; however, the key generation logic is dependent on the implementation of 2, 3 or 4 keys.

Simon supports the following combinations of block sizes, key sizes and number of rounds:

Block size (bits)	Key size (bits)	Rounds
32	64	32
48	72	36
48	96	36
64	96	42
64	128	44
96	96	52
96	144	54
128	128	68
128	192	69
128	256	72

=== Description of the key schedule ===
Let $S^{j}$ notate a left circular shift by $j$ bits.

The key schedule is mathematically described as

$k_{i+m} = \left\{ \begin{array}{ll} c\oplus\left(z_j\right)_i\oplus k_i \oplus\left(I\oplus S^{-1}\right)\left(S^{-3}k_{i+1}\right),&m=2\\ c\oplus\left(z_j\right)_i\oplus k_i \oplus\left(I\oplus S^{-1}\right)\left(S^{-3}k_{i+2}\right),&m=3\\ c\oplus\left(z_j\right)_i\oplus k_i \oplus\left(I\oplus S^{-1}\right)\left(S^{-3}k_{i+3}\oplus k_{i+1}\right),&m=4\\ \end{array}\right.$

The key schedule structure may or may not be balanced. The key word count of $m$ is used to determine the structure of the key expansion, resulting in a total bit width of $m*n$. The key word expansion consists of a right shift, XOR and a constant sequence, $z_x$. The $z_x$ bit operates on the lowest bit of the key word once per round.

==== Description of the constant sequence ====
The constant sequence, $z_x$, is created by a Linear Feedback Shift Register (LFSR). The logical sequence of bit constants is set by the value of the key and block sizes. The LFSR is created by a 5-bit field. The constant bit operates on a key block once per round on the lowest bit in order to add non-key-dependent entropy to the key schedule. The LFSR has different logic for each $z_x$ sequence; however, the initial condition is the same for encryption. The initial condition of the LFSR for decryption varies on the round.

Constant Sequence
$z_0 = 11111010001001010110000111001101111101000100101011000011100110$
$z_1 = 10001110111110010011000010110101000111011111001001100001011010$
$z_2 = 10101111011100000011010010011000101000010001111110010110110011$
$z_3 = 11011011101011000110010111100000010010001010011100110100001111$
$z_4 = 11010001111001101011011000100000010111000011001010010011101111$

== Cryptanalysis ==
The designers claim that Simon, though a "lightweight" cipher, is designed to have the full security possible for each block and key size, against standard chosen-plaintext (CPA) and chosen-ciphertext (CCA) attacks. Resistance against related-key attacks was also stated as a goal, though a less crucial one as attacks in that model are not relevant for typical use cases. No effort was made to resist attacks in the known-key distinguishing attack model, nor did the designers evaluate Simon for use as a hash function.

As of 2018, no successful attack on full-round Simon of any variant is known. Due to interest in Simon and Speck, about 70 cryptanalysis papers have been published on them. As is typical for iterated ciphers, reduced-round variants have been successfully attacked. The best published attacks on Simon in the standard attack model (CPA/CCA with unknown key) are differential cryptanalysis attacks; these make it through about 70–75% of the rounds of most variants, though these best attacks are only marginally faster than brute-force. The design team states that while designing Simon, they found differential attacks to be the limiting attacks, i.e. the type of attack that makes it through the most rounds; they then set the number of rounds to leave a security margin similar to AES-128's at approximately 30%.

Best known attacks on Simon (in standard attack model)
Variant	Rounds attacked	Time complexity	Data complexity	Attack type
Simon128/256	53/72 (74%)	2^{248}	2^{127.6}	Linear Hull
Simon128/192	51/69 (74%)	2^{184}	2^{127.6}	Linear Hull
Simon128/128	49/68 (72%)	2^{120}	2^{127.6}	Linear Hull
Simon96/144	38/54 (70%)	2^{136}	2^{95.2}	Linear Hull
Simon96/96	37/52 (71%)	2^{88}	2^{95.2}	Linear Hull
Simon64/128	31/44 (70%)	2^{120}	2^{63.5}	Linear Hull
Simon64/96	30/42 (71%)	2^{88}	2^{63.5}	Linear Hull
Simon48/96	25/36 (69%)	2^{80}	2^{47.9}	Linear Hull
Simon48/72	24/36 (67%)	2^{56}	2^{47.9}	Linear Hull
Simon32/64	24/32 (75%)	2^{63}	2^{32}	Integral

Simon has been criticized for having too small a security margin, i.e. too few rounds between the best attacks and the full cipher, in comparison to more conservative ciphers such as ChaCha20. Ciphers with small security margins are more likely to be broken by future advances in cryptanalysis. Simon's design team counters that there is a real-world cost to unnecessarily large security margins, especially on lightweight devices, that cryptanalysis during the design phase allowed the number of rounds to be set appropriately, and that they targeted AES's security margin.

Simon includes a round counter in the key schedule. The designers state this was included to block slide and rotational cryptanalysis attacks. Still, rotational-XOR cryptanalysis has been used to find distinguishers against reduced-round versions of related ciphers like Speck. Though the authors don't describe standard key-recovery attacks based on their distinguishers, their best distinguishers on Simon32 and Simon48 in the known-key distinguishing attack model for certain weak key classes make it through slightly more rounds than the best differential distinguishers. One of the authors has said that his research was resource-constrained and that rotational-XOR distinguishers on more rounds are probably possible. The designers also state that Simon was not designed to resist known-key distinguishing attacks (which do not directly compromise the confidentiality of ciphers).

The designers state that NSA cryptanalysis found the algorithms to have no weaknesses, and security commensurate with their key lengths. The design team says that their cryptanalysis included linear and differential cryptanalysis using standard techniques such as Matsui's algorithm and SAT/SMT solvers, though a full list of techniques used is not given. Simon's designers have been criticized for not providing more details on NSA cryptanalysis of the ciphers.

The NSA has approved Simon128/256 and Speck128/256 for use in U.S. National Security Systems, though AES-256 is still recommended for non-constrained applications.

== Standardization efforts and controversies ==
Initial attempts to standardise Simon and Speck through the International Organization for Standardization (ISO) failed to meet the required super-majority vote, and the ciphers were not adopted. Expert delegates to the ISO from several countries including Germany, Japan and Israel opposed the NSA's efforts to standardise the ciphers, citing concerns that the NSA is pushing for their standardisation with knowledge of exploitable weaknesses in the ciphers. The position was based on partial evidence of weaknesses in the ciphers, lack of clear need for standardisation of the new ciphers, and the NSA's previous involvement in the creation and promotion of the backdoored Dual_EC_DRBG cryptographic algorithm.

In response to concerns, the NSA stated that more than 70 security analysis papers from some of the world's leading cryptographers support NSA's conclusion that the algorithms are secure and NSA affirmed that it is not aware of any cryptanalytic techniques that would allow them or anyone else to exploit Simon or Speck.

After initial attempts to standardise the ciphers failed, the ISO standardised Simon and Speck in other working groups. As of October 2018, the Simon and Speck ciphers have been standardized by ISO as a part of the RFID air interface standard, ISO standard 29167-21 (for Simon) and ISO standard 29167-22 (for Speck), making them available for use by commercial entities.

== See also ==
- Balanced Boolean function
- Bent function
