= List of x86 cryptographic instructions =

Instructions that have been added to the x86 instruction set in order to assist efficient calculation of cryptographic primitives, such as e.g. AES encryption, SHA hash calculation and random number generation.

== Intel AES instructions ==
6 new instructions.

Instruction	Encoding	Description	Added in
AESENC xmm1,xmm2/m128	66 0F 38 DC /r	Perform one round of an AES encryption flow. Performs the SubBytes, ShiftRows, MixColumns and AddRoundKey steps of an AES encryption round, in that order. (Note: The SubBytes and ShiftRows steps of an AES encryption round may be performed in either order - the result of the instruction is the same either way. (Intel documentation describes the ShiftRows step as being performed first, while AMD documentation describes SubBytes as being performed first.) This also applies to the InvShiftRows/InvSubBytes steps of an AES decryption round.); The first source argument provides a 128-bit data-block to perform an encryption round on, the second source argument provides a round key for the AddRoundKey stage.	AES-NI Intel Westmere, Intel Silvermont, AMD Bulldozer, AMD Jaguar, VIA Nano QuadCore C4000 VAES Intel Ice Lake, Intel Rocket Lake, AMD Zen 3
AESENCLAST xmm1,xmm2/m128	66 0F 38 DD /r	Perform the last round of an AES encryption flow. Performs the SubBytes, ShiftRows and AddRoundKey steps of an AES encryption round, in that order.	AES-NI Intel Westmere, Intel Silvermont, AMD Bulldozer, AMD Jaguar, VIA Nano QuadCore C4000 VAES Intel Ice Lake, Intel Rocket Lake, AMD Zen 3
AESDEC xmm1,xmm2/m128	66 0F 38 DE /r	Perform one round of an AES decryption flow. Performs the InvShiftRows, InvSubBytes, InvMixColumns and AddRoundKey steps of an AES decryption round, in that order. (Note: For the intended AES decode flow under AES-NI (a series of AESDEC instructions followed by an AESDECLAST), the AESDEC instruction performs the InvMixColumns and AddRoundKey steps in the opposite order of what the AES specification (FIPS 197) indicates. As a result of this, the AES round key provided as the second source argument to AESDEC cannot just be taken from the Rijndael key schedule directly, but instead has to be postprocessed by performing an InvMixColumn on the round key after the key schedule and before it's used with AESDEC (this can be done with the AESIMC instruction or by doing an AESENCLAST+AESDEC sequence with the round key set to 0.) This issue is specific to (V)AESDEC and does not apply to round keys used with the AESENC, AESENCLAST or AESDECLAST instructions.)	AES-NI Intel Westmere, Intel Silvermont, AMD Bulldozer, AMD Jaguar, VIA Nano QuadCore C4000 VAES Intel Ice Lake, Intel Rocket Lake, AMD Zen 3
AESDECLAST xmm1,xmm2/m128	66 0F 38 DF /r	Perform the last round of an AES decryption flow. Performs the InvShiftRows, InvSubBytes and AddRoundKey steps of an AES decryption round, in that order.	AES-NI Intel Westmere, Intel Silvermont, AMD Bulldozer, AMD Jaguar, VIA Nano QuadCore C4000 VAES Intel Ice Lake, Intel Rocket Lake, AMD Zen 3
AESKEYGENASSIST xmm1,xmm2/m128,imm8	66 0F 3A DF /r ib	Assist in AES round key generation. The operation performed is: temp[127: 0] := SubBytes( src[127:0] )  // AES SubBytes step dest[ 31: 0] := temp[63:32] dest[ 63:32] := rotate_left( temp[63:32], 8 ) XOR RCON dest[ 95:64] := temp[127:96] dest[127:96] := rotate_left( temp[127:96], 8 ) XOR RCON where RCON is the instruction's imm8 argument zero-extended to 32 bits.	AES-NI Intel Westmere, Intel Silvermont, AMD Bulldozer, AMD Jaguar, VIA Nano QuadCore C4000 VAES Intel Ice Lake, Intel Rocket Lake, AMD Zen 3
AESIMC xmm1,xmm2/m128	66 0F 38 DB /r	Perform the InvMixColumns step of an AES decryption round on one 128-bit block. Mainly used to help prepare an AES key for use with the AESDEC instruction.	AES-NI Intel Westmere, Intel Silvermont, AMD Bulldozer, AMD Jaguar, VIA Nano QuadCore C4000 VAES Intel Ice Lake, Intel Rocket Lake, AMD Zen 3

== CLMUL instructions ==
Instruction	Opcode	Description
PCLMULQDQ xmm1,xmm2,imm8	66 0F 3A 44 /r ib	Perform a carry-less multiplication of two 64-bit polynomials over the finite field GF(2^{k}).
PCLMULLQLQDQ xmm1,xmm2/m128	66 0F 3A 44 /r 00	Multiply the low halves of the two 128-bit operands.
PCLMULHQLQDQ xmm1,xmm2/m128	66 0F 3A 44 /r 01	Multiply the high half of the destination register by the low half of the source operand.
PCLMULLQHQDQ xmm1,xmm2/m128	66 0F 3A 44 /r 10	Multiply the low half of the destination register by the high half of the source operand.
PCLMULHQHQDQ xmm1,xmm2/m128	66 0F 3A 44 /r 11	Multiply the high halves of the two 128-bit operands.

== RDRAND and RDSEED ==
Instruction	Encoding	Description	Added in
RDRAND r16 RDRAND r32	NFx 0F C7 /6	Return a random number that has been generated with a CSPRNG (Cryptographically Secure Pseudo-Random Number Generator) compliant with NIST SP 800-90A. (Note: The RDRAND and RDSEED instructions may fail to obtain and return a random number if the CPU's random number generators cannot keep up with the issuing of these instructions – if this happens, then software may retry the instructions (although the number of retries should be limited, in order to ensure forward progress). The instructions set EFLAGS.CF to 1 if a random number was successfully obtained and 0 otherwise. For RDSEED, failure to obtain a random number will also set the instruction's destination register to 0.)	Ivy Bridge, Silvermont, Excavator, Puma, ZhangJiang, Knights Landing,
RDRAND r64	NFx REX.W 0F C7 /6	Return a random number that has been generated with a CSPRNG (Cryptographically Secure Pseudo-Random Number Generator) compliant with NIST SP 800-90A.	Ivy Bridge, Silvermont, Excavator, Puma, ZhangJiang, Knights Landing,
RDSEED r16 RDSEED r32	NFx 0F C7 /7	Return a random number that has been generated with a HRNG/TRNG (Hardware/"True" Random Number Generator) compliant with NIST SP 800-90B and C.	Broadwell, ZhangJiang, Knights Landing, Zen 1, Gracemont
RDSEED r64	NFx REX.W 0F C7 /7	Return a random number that has been generated with a HRNG/TRNG (Hardware/"True" Random Number Generator) compliant with NIST SP 800-90B and C.	Broadwell, ZhangJiang, Knights Landing, Zen 1, Gracemont

== Intel SHA and SM3 instructions ==
These instructions provide support for cryptographic hash functions such as SHA-1, SHA-256, SHA-512 and SM3. Each of these hash functions works on fixed-size data blocks, where the processing of each data-block mostly consists of two major phases:

- First expand the data-block using a message schedule (that is specific to each hash function)
- Then perform a series of rounds of a compression function to combine the expanded data into a hash state.

For each of the supported hash functions, separate instructions are provided to help compute the message schedule (instructions with "MSG" in their names) and to help perform the compression function rounds (instructions with "RND" in their names).

Hash function extension	Instructions	Encoding (Note: Under Intel APX, none of the SHA-NI/SHA512/SM3 instructions can be encoded with the EVEX prefix - this prevents the use of the r16-r31 and xmm16-xmm31 registers with these instructions.)	Description	Added in
SHA-NI Secure Hash Algorithm: SHA-1 and SHA-256	SHA1RNDS4 xmm1,xmm2/m128,imm8	NP 0F 3A CC /r ib	Perform Four Rounds of SHA-1 Operation	Goldmont, Zen 1, Cannon Lake, LuJiaZui, Rocket Lake
SHA-NI Secure Hash Algorithm: SHA-1 and SHA-256	SHA1NEXTE xmm1,xmm2/m128	NP 0F 38 C8 /r	Calculate SHA-1 State Variable E after Four Rounds	Goldmont, Zen 1, Cannon Lake, LuJiaZui, Rocket Lake
SHA-NI Secure Hash Algorithm: SHA-1 and SHA-256	SHA1MSG1 xmm1,xmm2/m128	NP 0F 38 C9 /r	Perform an Intermediate Calculation for the Next Four SHA-1 Message Dwords	Goldmont, Zen 1, Cannon Lake, LuJiaZui, Rocket Lake
SHA-NI Secure Hash Algorithm: SHA-1 and SHA-256	SHA1MSG2 xmm1,xmm2/m128	NP 0F 38 CA /r	Perform a Final Calculation for the Next Four SHA-1 Message Dwords	Goldmont, Zen 1, Cannon Lake, LuJiaZui, Rocket Lake
SHA-NI Secure Hash Algorithm: SHA-1 and SHA-256	SHA256RNDS2 xmm1,xmm2/m128 SHA256RNDS2 xmm1,xmm2/m128,XMM0 (Note: Assemblers may accept SHA256RNDS2 with or without XMM0 as a third argument.)	NP 0F 38 CB /r	Perform Two Rounds of SHA256 Operation	Goldmont, Zen 1, Cannon Lake, LuJiaZui, Rocket Lake
SHA-NI Secure Hash Algorithm: SHA-1 and SHA-256	SHA256MSG1 xmm1,xmm2/m128	NP 0F 38 CC /r	Perform an Intermediate Calculation for the Next Four SHA-256 Message Dwords	Goldmont, Zen 1, Cannon Lake, LuJiaZui, Rocket Lake
SHA-NI Secure Hash Algorithm: SHA-1 and SHA-256	SHA256MSG2 xmm1,xmm2/m128	NP 0F 38 CD /r	Perform a Final Calculation for the Next Four SHA-256 Message Dwords	Goldmont, Zen 1, Cannon Lake, LuJiaZui, Rocket Lake
SHA512 Secure Hash Algorithm: SHA-512	VSHA512RNDS2 ymm1,ymm2,xmm3	VEX.256.F2.0F38.W0 CB /r	Perform Two Rounds of SHA-512 operation	Lunar Lake, Arrow Lake
SHA512 Secure Hash Algorithm: SHA-512	VSHA512MSG1 ymm1,xmm2	VEX.256.F2.0F38.W0 CC /r	Perform an Intermediate Calculation for the Next Four SHA-512 Message Qwords	Lunar Lake, Arrow Lake
SHA512 Secure Hash Algorithm: SHA-512	VSHA512MSG2 ymm1,ymm2	VEX.256.F2.0F38.W0 CD /r	Perform a Final Calculation for the Next Four SHA-512 Message Qwords	Lunar Lake, Arrow Lake
SM3 ShangMi 3 hash function	VSM3RNDS2 xmm1,xmm2,xmm3/m128,imm8	VEX.128.66.0F3A.W0 DE /r ib	Perform Two Rounds of SM3 Operation	Lunar Lake, Arrow Lake
SM3 ShangMi 3 hash function	VSM3MSG1 xmm1,xmm2,xmm3/m128	VEX.128.NP.0F38.W0 DA /r	Perform Initial Calculation for the Next Four SM3 Message Words	Lunar Lake, Arrow Lake
SM3 ShangMi 3 hash function	VSM3MSG2 xmm1,xmm2,xmm3/m128	VEX.128.66.0F38-W0 DA /r	Perform Final Calculation for the Next Four SM3 Message Words	Lunar Lake, Arrow Lake

== Intel Key Locker instructions ==
These instructions, available in Tiger Lake and later Intel processors, are designed to enable encryption/decryption with an AES key without having access to any unencrypted copies of the key during the actual encryption/decryption process.

Key Locker subset	Instruction	Encoding (Note: Under Intel APX, none of the Key Locker instructions can be encoded with the EVEX prefix - this prevents the use of the r16-r31 and xmm16-xmm31 registers with these instructions.)	Description	
KL Key Locker common instructions.	LOADIWKEY xmm1,xmm2	F3 0F 38 DC /r	Load internal wrapping key ("IWKey") from xmm1, xmm2 and XMM0. The two explicit operands (which must be register operands) specify a 256-bit encryption key. The implicit operand in XMM0 specifies a 128-bit integrity key. EAX contains flags controlling operation of instruction. (Note: The flags available for the LOADIWKEY instruction in the EAX register are: Bits / Flags; 0 / 1=Do not permit the wrapping key to be backed up to platform-scoped storage; 4:1 / KeySource field. The following values are supported: 0: use key input operands directly; 1: XOR the key input operands with 384 bits from hardware RNG; 31:5 / Reserved, must be set to 0) After being loaded, the IWKey cannot be directly read from software, but is used for the key wrapping done by ENCODEKEY128/256 and checked by the Key Locker encode/decode instructions. LOADIWKEY is privileged and can run in Ring 0 only.	
AESKLE AES Key Locker instructions.	ENCODEKEY128 r32,r32	F3 0F 38 FA /r	Wrap a 128-bit AES key from XMM0 into a 384-bit key handle - and output this handle to XMM0-2.	Source operand specifies handle restrictions to build into the handle. (Note: The handle restrictions available for the explicit source argument to ENCODEKEY128 and ENCODEKEY256 are: Bits / Flags; 0 / CPL0-only restriction; 1 / No-encrypt restriction; 2 / No-decrypt restriction; 31:3 / Reserved, must be set to 0) Destination operand is initialized with information about the source and attributes of the key (this matches the value that was provided in EAX for the most recent invocation of LOADIWKEY) These instructions may also modify XMM4-6 (zeroed out in existing implementations, but this should not be relied on).
AESKLE AES Key Locker instructions.	ENCODEKEY256 r32,r32	F3 0F 38 FB /r	Wrap a 256-bit AES key from XMM1:XMM0 into a 512-bit key handle - and output this handle to XMM0-3.	Source operand specifies handle restrictions to build into the handle. Destination operand is initialized with information about the source and attributes of the key (this matches the value that was provided in EAX for the most recent invocation of LOADIWKEY) These instructions may also modify XMM4-6 (zeroed out in existing implementations, but this should not be relied on).
AESKLE AES Key Locker instructions.	AESENC128KL xmm,m384	F3 0F 38 DC /r	Encrypt xmm using 128-bit AES key indicated by handle at m384 and store result in xmm. (Note: All of the AES Key Locker encode/decode instructions will check whether the handle is valid for the current IWKey and encode/decode data only if the handle is valid. These instructions will set the ZF flag to indicate whether the provided handle was valid (ZF=0) or not (ZF=1).)	
AESKLE AES Key Locker instructions.	AESDEC128KL xmm,m384	F3 0F 38 DD /r	Decrypt xmm using 128-bit AES key indicated by handle at m384 and store result in xmm.	
AESKLE AES Key Locker instructions.	AESENC256KL xmm,m512	F3 0F 38 DE /r	Encrypt xmm using 256-bit AES key indicated by handle at m512 and store result in xmm.	
AESKLE AES Key Locker instructions.	AESDEC256KL xmm,m512	F3 0F 38 DF /r	Decrypt xmm using 256-bit AES key indicated by handle at m512 and store result in xmm.	
AESKLE+WIDE_KL AES Wide Key Locker instructions. Perform encryption or decryption for eight 128-bit AES blocks at once.	AESENCWIDE128KL m384	F3 0F 38 D8 /0	Encrypt XMM0-7 using 128-bit AES key indicated by handle at m384 and store each resultant block back to its corresponding register.	
AESKLE+WIDE_KL AES Wide Key Locker instructions. Perform encryption or decryption for eight 128-bit AES blocks at once.	AESDECWIDE128KL m384	F3 0F 38 D8 /1	Decrypt XMM0-7 using 128-bit AES key indicated by handle at m384 and store each resultant block back to its corresponding register.	
AESKLE+WIDE_KL AES Wide Key Locker instructions. Perform encryption or decryption for eight 128-bit AES blocks at once.	AESENCWIDE256KL m512	F3 0F 38 D8 /2	Encrypt XMM0-7 using 256-bit AES key indicated by handle at m512 and store each resultant block back to its corresponding register.	
AESKLE+WIDE_KL AES Wide Key Locker instructions. Perform encryption or decryption for eight 128-bit AES blocks at once.	AESDECWIDE256KL m512	F3 0F 38 D8 /3	Decrypt XMM0-7 using 256-bit AES key indicated by handle at m512 and store each resultant block back to its corresponding register.	

== Hygon CIS instructions ==
Cryptographic instructions specific to Hygon processors.

Instruction set extension	Instruction mnemonics	Encoding	Description
SM3 ShangMi 3 hash function	VSM3RNDA xmm1,xmm2,xmm3/mem128,imm8	VEX.128.66.0F3A.W1 88 /r ib	SM3 round function, first part
SM3 ShangMi 3 hash function	VSM3RNDB xmm1,xmm2,xmm3/mem128	VEX.128.66.0F38.W1 F8 /r	SM3 round function, second part
SM3 ShangMi 3 hash function	VSM3MSGA xmm1,xmm2,xmm3/mem128,xmm4	VEX.128.66.0F3A.W1 89 /r /is4	SM3 message expansion, first part
SM3 ShangMi 3 hash function	VSM3MSGB xmm1,xmm2,xmm3/mem128	VEX.128.66.0F38.W1 F9 /r	SM3 message expansion, second part
SM4 ShangMi 4 block cipher	SM4RND xmm1,xmm2/mem128,imm8	66 0F 3A 8A /r ib	SM4 round function
SM4 ShangMi 4 block cipher	VSM4RND xmm1,xmm2,xmm3/mem128,imm8	VEX.128.66.0F3A.W1 8A /r ib	SM4 round function
SM4 ShangMi 4 block cipher	SM4RK xmm1,xmm2/mem128,imm8	66 0F 3A 8B /r ib	SM4 round key expansion
SM4 ShangMi 4 block cipher	VSM4RK xmm1,xmm2,xmm3/mem128,imm8	VEX.128.66.0F3A.W1 8B /r ib	SM4 round key expansion

== VIA/Zhaoxin PadLock instructions ==
The VIA/Zhaoxin PadLock instructions are instructions designed to apply cryptographic primitives in bulk, similar to the 8086 repeated string instructions. As such, unless otherwise specified, they take, as applicable, pointers to source data in ES:rSI and destination data in ES:rDI, and a data-size or count in rCX. Like the old string instructions, they are all designed to be interruptible.

PadLock subset	Instruction mnemonics (Note: For instruction mnemonics that are listed with a hyphen, different VIA PadLock documents differ with respect to whether the instruction names have a hyphen or not (e.g. version 1.0 of the ACE programming guide uses the hyphens, while v1.66 does not.) and assemblers may accept instruction mnemonics with or without the hyphen - e.g. GNU Binutils rev 2.17 and later accepts both. Some assemblers may also consider the REP prefix optional for instructions other than XSTORE - with such assemblers, the PadLock instructions will be assembled with one F3 (REP) prefix byte regardless of whether the assembly instruction is written with REP or not. (The F3 prefix is mandatory for all PadLock instructions except XSTORE.))	Encoding	Description	Added in
RNG Random Number Generation.	XSTORE, XSTORE-RNG	NFx 0F A7 C0	Store random bytes to ES:[rDI], and increment ES:rDI accordingly. XSTORE will store currently-available bytes, which may be from 0 to 8 bytes. REP XSTORE and REP XRNG2 will write the number of random bytes specified by rCX, waiting for the random number generator when needed. (Note: On some processors that support PadLock, the REP XSTORE instruction (but not REP XRNG2) may write not just the number of bytes specified in ECX, but up to 7 additional bytes as well. On at least some VIA Nano processors, XSTORE (without REP) has been observed to write 16 bytes.) EDX specifies a "quality factor". (Note: For the REP XRNG2 instruction, bits 1:0 of EDX are used to indicate whether the instruction should return hardware random numbers directly (EDX[1:0]==0) or return postprocessed numbers (EDX[1:0] ≠ 0).)	Nehemiah (stepping 3)
RNG Random Number Generation.	REP XSTORE, REP XSTORE-RNG	F3 0F A7 C0	Store random bytes to ES:[rDI], and increment ES:rDI accordingly. XSTORE will store currently-available bytes, which may be from 0 to 8 bytes. REP XSTORE and REP XRNG2 will write the number of random bytes specified by rCX, waiting for the random number generator when needed. EDX specifies a "quality factor".	Nehemiah (stepping 3)
RNG Random Number Generation.	REP XRNG2	F3 0F A7 F8	Store random bytes to ES:[rDI], and increment ES:rDI accordingly. XSTORE will store currently-available bytes, which may be from 0 to 8 bytes. REP XSTORE and REP XRNG2 will write the number of random bytes specified by rCX, waiting for the random number generator when needed. EDX specifies a "quality factor".	ZhangJiang (Note: As of 2024, the REP XRNG2, REP XSHA384, REP XSHA512, REP MONTMUL2 and REP XMODEXP instructions exist as documented instructions only on Zhaoxin processors. A VIA-provided OpenSSL patch from 2011 indicates that these instructions were present on the VIA Nano, however VIA has not published documentation for these instructions.)
ACE Advanced Cryptography Engine.	REP XCRYPT-ECB	F3 0F A7 C8	Encrypt/Decrypt data, using the AES cipher in various block modes (ECB, CBC, CFB, OFB and CTR, respectively). rCX contains the number of 16-byte blocks to encrypt/decrypt, rBX contains a pointer to an encryption key, ES:rAX a pointer to an initialization vector for block modes that need it, and ES:rDX a pointer to a control word. (Note: The control word for REP XCRYPT* is a 16-byte (128-bit) data structure with the following layout: Bits / Usage; 3:0 / AES round count; 4 / Digest mode enable (ACE2 only); 5 / 1=allow data that are not 16-byte aligned (ACE2 only); 6 / Cipher: 0=AES, 1=undefined; 7 / Key schedule: 0=compute (128-bit key only), 1=load from memory; 8 / 0=normal, 1=intermediate-result; 9 / 0=encrypt, 1=decrypt; 11:10 / Key size: 00=128-bit, 01=192-bit, 10=256-bit, 11=reserved; 127:12 / Reserved, must be set to 0; If bit 5 is set in order to allow unaligned data, then the REP XCRYPT* instructions will use the 112 bytes directly after the control word as a scratchpad memory area for data realignment.)	Nehemiah (stepping 8)
ACE Advanced Cryptography Engine.	REP XCRYPT-CBC	F3 0F A7 D0	Encrypt/Decrypt data, using the AES cipher in various block modes (ECB, CBC, CFB, OFB and CTR, respectively). rCX contains the number of 16-byte blocks to encrypt/decrypt, rBX contains a pointer to an encryption key, ES:rAX a pointer to an initialization vector for block modes that need it, and ES:rDX a pointer to a control word.	Nehemiah (stepping 8)
ACE Advanced Cryptography Engine.	REP XCRYPT-CFB	F3 0F A7 E0	Encrypt/Decrypt data, using the AES cipher in various block modes (ECB, CBC, CFB, OFB and CTR, respectively). rCX contains the number of 16-byte blocks to encrypt/decrypt, rBX contains a pointer to an encryption key, ES:rAX a pointer to an initialization vector for block modes that need it, and ES:rDX a pointer to a control word.	Nehemiah (stepping 8)
ACE Advanced Cryptography Engine.	REP XCRYPT-OFB	F3 0F A7 E8	Encrypt/Decrypt data, using the AES cipher in various block modes (ECB, CBC, CFB, OFB and CTR, respectively). rCX contains the number of 16-byte blocks to encrypt/decrypt, rBX contains a pointer to an encryption key, ES:rAX a pointer to an initialization vector for block modes that need it, and ES:rDX a pointer to a control word.	Nehemiah (stepping 8)
ACE2 (Note: In addition to the new REP XCRYPT-CTR instruction, ACE2 also adds extra features to the other REP XCRYPT instructions: a digest mode for the CBC and CFB instructions, and the ability to use input/output data that are not 16-byte aligned for the non-ECB instructions.)	REP XCRYPT-CTR	F3 0F A7 D8	Encrypt/Decrypt data, using the AES cipher in various block modes (ECB, CBC, CFB, OFB and CTR, respectively). rCX contains the number of 16-byte blocks to encrypt/decrypt, rBX contains a pointer to an encryption key, ES:rAX a pointer to an initialization vector for block modes that need it, and ES:rDX a pointer to a control word.	C7 "Esther"
PHE Hash Engine.	REP XSHA1	F3 0F A6 C8	Compute a cryptographic hash (using the SHA-1 and SHA-256 functions, respectively). ES:rSI points to data to compute a hash for, ES:rDI points to a message digest and rCX specifies the number of bytes. (Note: On Zhaoxin ZX-D ("WuDaoKou") and later processors, executing any of the REP SHA* or CCS_SM3 hashing instructions with rCX set to 0 will cause the instruction to act as a NOP, skipping the FIPS-180-2 length-extension procedure that the specifications for the SHA and SM3 hash functions require for hashes even of length-0 strings - as a result, software that makes use of these instructions needs to special-case the length-0 case.) rAX should be set to 0 at the start of a calculation. (Note: On VIA Nano and later processors, setting rAX to an all-1s value for the REP XSHA* instructions will enable an alternate operation mode, where rCX specifies the number of 64-byte blocks, and where the standard FIPS-180-2 length extension procedure at the end of the hash calculation is omitted. This makes for a variant more suitable for data streaming than the original EAX=0 variant. This functionality also exists for CCS_HASH.)	Esther
PHE Hash Engine.	REP XSHA256	F3 0F A6 D0	Compute a cryptographic hash (using the SHA-1 and SHA-256 functions, respectively). ES:rSI points to data to compute a hash for, ES:rDI points to a message digest and rCX specifies the number of bytes. rAX should be set to 0 at the start of a calculation.	Esther
PHE Hash Engine.	REP XSHA384	F3 0F A6 D8	Perform computation of a SHA-384/SHA-512 cryptographic hash. ES:rSI points to a series of 128-byte data chunks to perform hash computation for, ES:rDI points to a 64-byte digest to update, and ECX specifies the number of chunks to process. (Note: The per-chunk calculation is identical for SHA-384 and SHA-512 - as a result of this, the REP XSHA384 and REP XSHA512 instructions perform identical operations.)	ZhangJiang
PHE Hash Engine.	REP XSHA512	F3 0F A6 E0	Perform computation of a SHA-384/SHA-512 cryptographic hash. ES:rSI points to a series of 128-byte data chunks to perform hash computation for, ES:rDI points to a 64-byte digest to update, and ECX specifies the number of chunks to process.	ZhangJiang
PMM Montgomery/Modular Multiplication.	REP MONTMUL	F3 0F A6 C0 (Note: The REP MONTMUL instruction is only supported with an AddressSize of 32 bits - for this reason, the address-size override prefix (67h) is required in 16-bit and 64-bit modes, but disallowed in 32-bit mode.)	Perform Montgomery Multiplication. Takes an operand width in ECX (given as a number of bits – must be in range 256..32768 and divisible by 128) and pointer to a data structure in ES:ESI. (Note: The data structure to REP MONTMUL contains six 32-bit elements, where the first one is a negated modular inverse of the bottom 32 bits of the modulus and the remaining 5 are pointers to various memory buffers (each of which uses the ES segment and must be 16-byte aligned): Offset / Data item; 0 / Negated modular inverse; 4 / Pointer to first multiplicand; 8 / Pointer to second multiplicand; 12 / Pointer to result buffer; 16 / Pointer to modulus; 20 / Pointer to 32-byte scratchpad) When starting a new Montgomery Multiplication, EAX and the result buffer in memory must be filled with all-0s before executing the REP MONTMUL instruction. (Nonzero values are used to help resume the calculation if the instruction was interrupted.)	Esther
PMM Montgomery/Modular Multiplication.	REP MONTMUL2	F3 0F A6 F0	Perform modular multiplication/exponentiation. Takes pointers (all using the ES: segment) to bignum integers $A, B, M, R$ in registers rAX, rBX, rDX, rDI, respectively, where $A$ and $B$ are input numbers, $M$ is a modulus, (Note: For REP MONTMUL2 and REP XMODEXP, the modulus $M$ is required to be greater than both $A$ and $B$, and is also required to be odd. The instructions will produce a #GP exception if this is not the case.) and $R$ will be overwritten with the result. The operation performed is: REP MONTMUL2: $R:=\left(A * B\right)\text{ mod }M$; REP XMODEXP: $R:=\left(A^{B}\right)\text{ mod }M$; ECX provides the size of the bignums, in number of bits (256..32768, must be divisble by 128), and ES:rSI provides a pointer to a scratchpad area to use during the calculation. (Note: Given a bignum size of N bits, the scratchpad memory area pointed to by ES:rSI for the REP MONTMUL2 and REP XMODEXP must have a size of at least $3 * (N/8) + 40$ bytes (e.g. for a 2048-bit bignum size, the scratchpad must be at least 808 bytes). Also, before starting either of these instructions, the 8 first bytes of this scratchpad must be zeroed out and the bignum size given in ECX must also be written as a 64-bit integer to the next 8 bytes.)	ZhangJiang
PMM Montgomery/Modular Multiplication.	REP XMODEXP	F3 0F A6 F8		ZhangJiang
GMI Chinese national cryptographic algorithms. (Zhaoxin only.)	CCS_HASH, CCS_SM3 (Note: The CCS instructions are listed with different mnemonics in different Zhaoxin sources - e.g. the CCS_SM3/CCS_SM4 mnemomics are used in a 2019 article, while CCS_HASH/CCS_ENCRYPT are used in a 2020 article.)	F3 0F A6 E8	Compute SM3 hash, similar to the REP XSHA* instructions. The rBX register is used to specify hash function (20h for SM3 being the only documented value).	ZhangJiang
GMI Chinese national cryptographic algorithms. (Zhaoxin only.)	CCS_ENCRYPT, CCS_SM4	F3 0F A7 F0	Encrypt/Decrypt data, using the SM4 cipher in various block modes. rCX contains the number of 16-byte blocks to encrypt/decrypt, rBX contains a pointer to an encryption key, rDX a pointer to an initialization vector for block modes that need it, and rAX contains a control word. (Note: The CCS_ENCRYPT control word in rAX has the following format: Bits / Usage; 0 / 0=Encrypt, 1=Decrypt; 5:1 / Must be 10000b for SM4.; 6 / ECB block mode; 7 / CBC block mode; 8 / CFB block mode; 9 / OFB block mode; 10 / CTR block mode; 11 / Digest enable; Remaining bits in rAX must be set to all-0s. Of bits 10:6 in rAX (block mode selection), exactly one bit must be set, or else behavior is undefined.)	ZhangJiang
GMI Chinese national cryptographic algorithms. (Zhaoxin only.)	SM2	F2 0F A6 C0	Perform SM2 (public key cryptographic algorithm) function. The function to perform is specified in bits 5:0 of EDX (Note: The supported functions in bits 5:0 of EDX for the SM2 instruction are: Value / Meaning; 0x01 / Encryption; 0x02 / Decryption; 0x04 / Signature; 0x08 / Verify signature; 0x10 / Key exchange 1; 0x11 / Key exchange 2 without hash; 0x12 / Key exchange 3 without hash; 0x15 / Key exchange 2 with hash; 0x16 / Key exchange 3 with hash; 0x20 / Preprocess1 to calculate hash value Z of user’s identification; 0x21 / Preprocess2 to calculate hash value e of hash value Z and message M) - depending on function, rAX/rBX/rCX/rSI/rDI may provide additional input arguments. The instruction returns a status bit in EDX bit 6 (0=success, 1=failure) - depending on function, rAX, rCX and rDI may be modified as well.	KX-6000G
