= AMD–Chinese joint venture =

The AMD–Chinese joint venture is the agreement between the American semiconductor company Advanced Micro Devices (AMD) and China-based partners to license and build x86-compatible CPUs for the Chinese-based market. China has been unable to produce a CPU based on its own technology; This is significant because the joint venture was negotiated and agreed to well before the 2018 trade war between the US and China and the international chip shortage of the early 2020s. Unlike Taiwan, China does not have an established or lucrative microchip industry or even capabilities for that matter. It is similar to the Zhaoxin joint venture supported by VIA Technologies. Unlike other industries in which China naturally excels, the microchip industry requires significant research and development.

== Structure ==
AMD has received permission from the US Department of Defense and Department of Commerce to export the Zen 1 core design to China. Due to legal restrictions AMD has set up multiple companies to allow licensing of x86 technology to China. The overarching joint venture is the Tianjin Haiguang Advanced Technology Investment Co. Ltd. (THATIC). THATIC is owned by "AMD and both public and private Chinese companies, including the Chinese Academy of Sciences": however its major share is reportedly owned by AMD itself.

The joint-venture set up Haiguang Microelectronics Co. Ltd. (HMC) and Chengdu Haiguang Integrated Circuit Design Co. Ltd. (Hygon), with controlling stakes being held by AMD and THATIC respectively. HMC owns the local intellectual property and subcontracts manufacturing for the chip, while Hygon designs the chip and markets and sells the processors.

== History ==
The joint venture was announced by AMD in 2016. The first processor was released in 2018. At the Computex 2019 trade show, AMD CEO Lisa Su confirmed that the licence will be limited to the original Zen architecture, and would not be extended to Zen 2.

On June 24, 2019, the U.S. government placed one of the parent companies, and thus the joint venture, on its export control Entity List, which bans further technology transfers from AMD and possibly hampers its existing operations. The opinion of Anandtech is that further AMD involvement in the joint venture will be minimal due to the ban.

== Microprocessors ==
=== Hygon SOC ===
The initial microprocessor created in 2018 is the Hygon Dhyana system on a chip. It is noted to be a variant of the AMD Epyc and is so similar that "there is little to no differentiation between the chips." It has been noted that there is "less than 200 lines of new kernel code" for Linux kernel support, and that the Dhyana is "mostly a re-branded Zen CPU for the Chinese server market."

Testing in 2020 suggested that "integer performance is essentially identical, however the floating point and RDRAND and RDSEED instructions' performance has been reduced" from the equivalent Zen 1 processor. The cryptography extensions like AES have been replaced by Chinese versions called SM2, SM3 and SM4 which are according to Anandtech are very similar to ECC(-based), SHA-256 and AES-128 algorithms respectively. AVX/AVX2 was also disabled, but the research has suspected that it happened due to a bug rather than was done intentionally.

== See also ==
- Hygon Information Technology
- Zhaoxin – a similar joint venture to produce x86 processors between VIA Technologies and Chinese partners
- Epyc – the AMD processors that the Hygon Dhyana is based on
