= SM3 =

SM3, Sm3, sM3, sm3 or SM-3 may refer to:

- Spider-Man 3, the third Spider-Man film released in 2007
- Superman III, the third Superman film released in 1983
- Renault Samsung SM3, a car model made by Renault Samsung
- VR Class Sm3, a type of train operated by the VR Group
- SM3 postcode area, the Sutton postcode area covering North Cheam
- RIM-161 Standard Missile 3, a naval launched anti-ballistic missile used by the US Navy
- SM3 (hash function), a standardised cryptographic hash function for commercial use in China
- Standard cubic meter (Sm^{3}), an industrial unit measuring the amount of a gas
- Shawn Mendes (album) or SM3, the third album by the Canadian singer Shawn Mendes
