= Grand cru =

Grand cru may refer to:

- Grand cru (wine), a regional wine classification
- Grand cru (food and drink) a non-official descriptor for other products such as beer and chocolate
- Grand Cru (cipher), a block cipher
- Grand Cru, a 2010 film starring Hailee Steinfeld
- Grand cru, a 2015 album by Danish rapper L.O.C.

== See also ==
- Grand Crew, a TV situation comedy whose title is a pun on "Grand Cru"
- Grand Kru County, a county in the nation of Liberia
