= Grand Cru (cipher) =

Block cipher

General
- Designers: Johan Borst
- First published: 2000
- Derived from: Rijndael

Cipher detail
- Key sizes: 128 bits
- Block sizes: 128 bits
- Structure: Substitution–permutation network
- Rounds: 10

In cryptography, Grand Cru is a block cipher invented in 2000 by Johan Borst. It was submitted to the NESSIE project, but was not selected.

Grand Cru is a 10-round substitution–permutation network based largely on Rijndael (or AES). It replaces a number of Rijndael's unkeyed operations with key-dependent ones, in a way consistent with the security purposes of each operation. The intent is to produce a cipher at least as secure as Rijndael, and perhaps much more secure. The block size and key size are both 128 bits, and the key schedule is the same as Rijndael's.

Grand Cru is designed on the principle of multiple layered security. It is equivalent to a chain of 4 subciphers with independent keys, such that if 3 of the keys are known, the remaining cipher should still be secure.
