= Crypto API =

Crypto API may refer to:

- Crypto API (Linux)
- Microsoft CryptoAPI
