= Hygon Information Technology =

Chinese fabless semiconductor manufacturing company

Hygon Information Technology Co. Ltd.
- Native name: 海光信息技术股份有限公司
- Formerly: Tianjin Haiguang Advanced Technology Investment
- Type: Public
- Traded as: SSE: 688041; CSI A100
- Industry: Semiconductors
- Founded: 24 October 2014; 11 years ago
- Headquarters: Beijing, China
- Key people: Meng Xiantang (Chairman); Sha Chaoqun (CEO)
- Revenue: ▲CN¥6.01 billion (2023)
- Net income: ▲CN¥1.70 billion (2023)
- Total assets: ▲CN¥22.90 billion (2023)
- Total equity: ▲CN¥20.32 billion (2023)
- Owner: Sugon (27.96%)
- Number of employees: 1,790 (2023)
- Website: www.hygon.cn

Hygon Information Technology (also known as Hygon and HiGon; Chinese: 海光信息; pinyin: Hǎiguāng Xìnxī) is a publicly listed Chinese fabless semiconductor company headquartered in Beijing.

The company mainly produces Intel x86 compatible central processing units (CPUs) as well as domestic Deep Learning Processors. Its R&D expenses are nearly 70% of sales.

== History ==
The company was originally established in October 2014 under the name Tianjin Haiguang Advanced Technology Investment (THATIC) and was registered in Tianjin. Later on it changed its name to Hygon.

In 2016, based on the AMD–Chinese joint venture agreement, the company and AMD formed two joint ventures (JVs), Chengdu Haiguang Microelectronics (HM) and Chengdu Haiguang Integrated Circuit Design (HICD). HMC was 51% owned by AMD and 49% by Hygon while HICD was 30% owned by AMD 70% by Hygon. HM works with AMD for design and GlobalFoundries for manufacturing while HICD works with HM to add co-design elements and packaging, then selling the silicon to China. The end goal was to provide China a local version of AMD's Zen 1 CPUs that would be used only in its domestic market. Under the licensing agreement, AMD would receive $293 million as part of the licensing agreement.

The first microprocessor created from the JV partnership was the Hygon Dhyana system on a chip which went into the Chinese market in 2018.

On 24 June 2019, Hygon as well as its related entities including the joint ventures were added to the Bureau of Industry and Security Entity List. As a result, AMD could no longer license any additional intellectual property (IP) to the JVs although Hygon still had access to the original IP it licensed and could continue to manage it by itself. However the restriction also meant HM could no longer order silicon from GlobalFoundries which would hamper the process.

On 12 August 2022, Hygon held its initial public offering (IPO) on the Shanghai Stock Exchange STAR Market. On its debut, the price started at 36 yuan and closed 67% higher at 60.10 yuan. Raising 10.6 billion yuan (US$1.6 billion), it was one of the largest IPOs in China for that year.

In February 2024, Bloomberg News reported that Hygon was one of the top investment picks among Wall Street firms such as Barclays and Sanford C. Bernstein. Since the trade restrictions came into effect, Hygon had managed to develop its own products.

In May 2025, it was announced that Hygon would merge with Sugon. On 10 December 2025, it was reported that the deal was called off.

== See also ==
- Semiconductor industry in China
- AMD
- AMD–Chinese joint venture
