= Rijndael MixColumns =

Cryptographic operation in the Rijndael encryption algorithm

The MixColumns operation performed by the Rijndael cipher or Advanced Encryption Standard is, along with the ShiftRows step, its primary source of diffusion. Each column of bytes is treated as a four-term polynomial $b(x) = b_3 x^3 + b_2 x^2 + b_1 x + b_0$, each byte representing an element in the Galois field $\operatorname{GF}(2^8)$. The coefficients are elements within the prime sub-field $\operatorname{GF}(2)$.

Each column is multiplied with the fixed polynomial $a(x) = 3x^3 + x^2 + x + 2$ modulo $x^4 + 1$; the inverse function is $a^{-1}(x) = 11x^3 + 13x^2 + 9x + 14$.

== Demonstration ==
The MixColumns operation will use the fixed polynomial $a(x) = 3x^3 + x^2 + x + 2$, which will be expressed as $a(x) = a_3 x^3 + a_2 x^2 + a_1 x + a_0$. We note that in $a(x)$, there are the corresponding constants
$$\begin{bmatrix}3&1&1&2\end{bmatrix}$$
. From there, there are multiple ways to execute the function. Here, the operation can be expressed in terms of polynomial multiplication and matrix multiplication. Regardless, the function always uses the exclusive or $\oplus$.

=== Polynomial multiplication ===
For the fixed polynomial $a(x)$ and the column of bytes $b(x)$, we can multiply these two together to result in the following:

$$\begin{align}
a(x) \bullet b(x) = c(x)
&= \left(a_3 x^3 + a_2 x^2 + a_1 x + a_0\right) \bullet \left(b_3 x^3 + b_2 x^2 + b_1 x + b_0\right) \\
&= c_6 x^6 + c_5 x^5 + c_4 x^4 + c_3 x^3 + c_2 x^2 + c_1 x + c_0
\end{align}$$

We see that $c(x)$ is a seven-term polynomial, where its constants $c_0$ to $c_6$ should satisfy the following:

$$\begin{align}
c_0 &= a_0 \bullet b_0 \\
c_1 &= a_1 \bullet b_0 \oplus a_0 \bullet b_1 \\
c_2 &= a_2 \bullet b_0 \oplus a_1 \bullet b_1 \oplus a_0 \bullet b_2 \\
c_3 &= a_3 \bullet b_0 \oplus a_2 \bullet b_1 \oplus a_1 \bullet b_2 \oplus a_0  \bullet b_3 \\
c_4 &= a_3 \bullet b_1 \oplus a_2 \bullet b_2 \oplus a_1 \bullet b_3 \\
c_5 &= a_3 \bullet b_2 \oplus a_2 \bullet b_3 \\
c_6 &= a_3 \bullet b_3
\end{align}$$

==== Modular reduction ====
As AES operates on four-byte "words", and that any overflow can break the algorithm, $c(x)$ must be reduced to a four-byte word, which is done by performing a modulo multiplication with $x^4 + 1$.

Another method to prevent overflow is its treatment of each byte as an element in the Galois field $\operatorname{GF}(2^8)$. All arithmetic functions in this finite field - addition, subtraction, multiplication, division - always result in an 8-bit number. If we do some basic polynomial modular operations we can see that:

$$\begin{align}
x^6 \bmod \left(x^4 + 1\right) &= -x^2 = x^2 \text{ over } \operatorname{GF}\left(2^8\right) \\
x^5 \bmod \left(x^4 + 1\right) &= -x = x \text{ over } \operatorname{GF}\left(2^8\right) \\
x^4 \bmod \left(x^4 + 1\right) &= -1 = 1 \text{ over } \operatorname{GF}\left(2^8\right)
\end{align}$$

In general, we can say that for any $i \leq6$, then $x^i\bmod \left(x^4 + 1\right) = x^{i\bmod 4}.$

From here, we calculate the polynomial multiplication modulo of $a(x)$ and $b(x)$ to result in the output:

$$\begin{align}
d(x) = a(x) \otimes b(x) &= c(x) \bmod \left(x^4 + 1\right) \\
&= \left(c_6 x^6 + c_5 x^5 + c_4 x^4 + c_3 x^3 + c_2 x^2 + c_1 x + c_0\right) \bmod \left(x^4 + 1\right) \\
&= c_6 x^{6\bmod 4} + c_5 x^{5\bmod 4} + c_4 x^{4\bmod 4} + c_3 x^{3\bmod 4} + c_2 x^{2\bmod 4} + c_1 x^{1\bmod 4} + c_0 x^{0\bmod 4} \\
&= c_6 x^2 + c_5 x + c_4 + c_3 x^3 + c_2 x^2 + c_1 x + c_0 \\
&= c_3 x^3 + \left(c_2 \oplus c_6\right) x^2 + \left(c_1 \oplus c_5\right) x + c_0 \oplus c_4 \\
&= d_3 x^3 + d_2 x^2 + d_1 x + d_0
\end{align}$$

where

$$d_0 = c_0 \oplus c_4$$
$$d_1 = c_1 \oplus c_5$$
$$d_2 = c_2 \oplus c_6$$
$$d_3 = c_3$$

=== Matrix representation ===
Here, let $d_n$ be the outputting bytes of the operation. The coefficient $d_3$, $d_2$, $d_1$ and $d_0$ can be expressed as follows:

$$d_0 = a_0 \bullet b_0 \oplus a_3 \bullet b_1 \oplus a_2 \bullet b_2 \oplus a_1 \bullet b_3$$
$$d_1 = a_1 \bullet b_0 \oplus a_0 \bullet b_1 \oplus a_3 \bullet b_2 \oplus a_2 \bullet b_3$$
$$d_2 = a_2 \bullet b_0 \oplus a_1 \bullet b_1 \oplus a_0 \bullet b_2 \oplus a_3 \bullet b_3$$
$$d_3 = a_3 \bullet b_0 \oplus a_2 \bullet b_1 \oplus a_1 \bullet b_2 \oplus a_0 \bullet b_3$$

And when we replace the coefficients of $a(x)$ with the constants
$$\begin{bmatrix}3&1&1&2\end{bmatrix}$$
used in the cipher, we obtain the following:

$$d_0 = 2 \bullet b_0 \oplus 3 \bullet b_1 \oplus 1 \bullet b_2 \oplus 1 \bullet b_3$$
$$d_1 = 1 \bullet b_0 \oplus 2 \bullet b_1 \oplus 3 \bullet b_2 \oplus 1 \bullet b_3$$
$$d_2 = 1 \bullet b_0 \oplus 1 \bullet b_1 \oplus 2 \bullet b_2 \oplus 3 \bullet b_3$$
$$d_3 = 3 \bullet b_0 \oplus 1 \bullet b_1 \oplus 1 \bullet b_2 \oplus 2 \bullet b_3$$

This demonstrates that the operation itself is similar to a Hill cipher. It can be performed by multiplying a coordinate vector of four numbers in Rijndael's Galois field by the following circulant MDS matrix:

$$\begin{bmatrix}d_0\\d_1\\d_2\\d_3\end{bmatrix} =
\begin{bmatrix}
2&3&1&1 \\
1&2&3&1 \\
1&1&2&3 \\
3&1&1&2 \end{bmatrix} \begin{bmatrix}b_0\\b_1\\b_2\\b_3\end{bmatrix}$$

== Implementation example ==
This can be simplified somewhat in actual implementation by replacing the multiply by 2 with a single shift and conditional exclusive or, and replacing a multiply by 3 with a multiply by 2 combined with an exclusive or. A C example of such an implementation follows:

void gmix_column(unsigned char *r) {
    unsigned char a[4];
    unsigned char b[4];
    unsigned char c;
    unsigned char h;
    /* The array 'a' is simply a copy of the input array 'r'
     * The array 'b' is each element of the array 'a' multiplied by 2
     * in Rijndael's Galois field
     * a[n] ^ b[n] is element n multiplied by 3 in Rijndael's Galois field */ 
    for (c = 0; c < 4; c++) {
        a[c] = r[c];
        /* h is set to 0x01 if the high bit of r[c] is set, 0x00 otherwise */
        h = r[c] >> 7;    /* logical right shift, thus shifting in zeros */
        b[c] = r[c] << 1; /* implicitly removes high bit because b[c] is an 8-bit char, so we xor by 0x1b and not 0x11b in the next line */
        b[c] ^= h * 0x1B; /* Rijndael's Galois field */
    }
    r[0] = b[0] ^ a[3] ^ a[2] ^ b[1] ^ a[1]; /* 2 * a0 + a3 + a2 + 3 * a1 */
    r[1] = b[1] ^ a[0] ^ a[3] ^ b[2] ^ a[2]; /* 2 * a1 + a0 + a3 + 3 * a2 */
    r[2] = b[2] ^ a[1] ^ a[0] ^ b[3] ^ a[3]; /* 2 * a2 + a1 + a0 + 3 * a3 */
    r[3] = b[3] ^ a[2] ^ a[1] ^ b[0] ^ a[0]; /* 2 * a3 + a2 + a1 + 3 * a0 */
}

A C# example

// Galois Field (256) Multiplication of two bytes
private byte GMul(byte a, byte b)
{
    byte p = 0;

    for (int counter = 0; counter < 8; counter++)
    {
        if ((b & 1) != 0)
        {
            p ^= a;
        }

        bool hi_bit_set = (a & 0x80) != 0;
        a <<= 1;
        if (hi_bit_set)
        {
            a ^= 0x1B; /* x^8 + x^4 + x^3 + x + 1 */
        }
        b >>= 1;
    }

    return p;
}

// 's' is the main State matrix, 'ss' is a temp matrix of the same dimensions as 's'.
private void MixColumns()
{
    Array.Clear(ss, 0, ss.Length);

    for (int c = 0; c < 4; c++)
    {
        ss[0, c] = (byte)(GMul(0x02, s[0, c]) ^ GMul(0x03, s[1, c]) ^ s[2, c] ^ s[3, c]);
        ss[1, c] = (byte)(s[0, c] ^ GMul(0x02, s[1, c]) ^ GMul(0x03, s[2, c]) ^ s[3,c]);
        ss[2, c] = (byte)(s[0, c] ^ s[1, c] ^ GMul(0x02, s[2, c]) ^ GMul(0x03, s[3, c]));
        ss[3, c] = (byte)(GMul(0x03, s[0,c]) ^ s[1, c] ^ s[2, c] ^ GMul(0x02, s[3, c]));
    }

    ss.CopyTo(s, 0);
}

== Test vectors for MixColumn() ==
Hexadecimal		Decimal	
Before	After	Before	After
63 47 a2 f0	5d e0 70 bb	99 71 162 240	93 224 112 187
f2 0a 22 5c	9f dc 58 9d	242 10 34 92	159 220 88 157
01 01 01 01	01 01 01 01	1 1 1 1	1 1 1 1
c6 c6 c6 c6	c6 c6 c6 c6	198 198 198 198	198 198 198 198
d4 d4 d4 d5	d5 d5 d7 d6	212 212 212 213	213 213 215 214
2d 26 31 4c	4d 7e bd f8	45 38 49 76	77 126 189 248

== InverseMixColumns ==
The MixColumns operation has the following inverse (numbers are decimal):

$$\begin{bmatrix}b_0\\b_1\\b_2\\b_3\end{bmatrix} = \begin{bmatrix}
14&11&13&9 \\
9&14&11&13 \\
13&9&14&11 \\
11&13&9&14 \end{bmatrix} \begin{bmatrix}d_0\\d_1\\d_2\\d_3\end{bmatrix}$$

Or:

$$\begin{align}
b_0 &= 14 \bullet d_0 \oplus 11 \bullet d_1 \oplus 13 \bullet d_2 \oplus  9 \bullet d_3 \\
b_1 &= 9 \bullet d_0 \oplus 14 \bullet d_1 \oplus 11 \bullet d_2 \oplus 13 \bullet d_3 \\
b_2 &= 13 \bullet d_0 \oplus  9 \bullet d_1 \oplus 14 \bullet d_2 \oplus 11 \bullet d_3 \\
b_3 &= 11 \bullet d_0 \oplus 13 \bullet d_1 \oplus  9 \bullet d_2 \oplus 14 \bullet d_3
\end{align}$$

== Galois Multiplication lookup tables ==
Commonly, rather than implementing Galois multiplication, Rijndael implementations simply use pre-calculated lookup tables to perform the byte multiplication by 2, 3, 9, 11, 13, and 14.

For instance, in C# these tables can be stored in Byte[256] arrays. In order to compute

p * 3

The result is obtained this way:

result = table_3[(int)p]

Some of the most common instances of these lookup tables are as follows:

Multiply by 2:

0x00,0x02,0x04,0x06,0x08,0x0a,0x0c,0x0e,0x10,0x12,0x14,0x16,0x18,0x1a,0x1c,0x1e,
0x20,0x22,0x24,0x26,0x28,0x2a,0x2c,0x2e,0x30,0x32,0x34,0x36,0x38,0x3a,0x3c,0x3e,
0x40,0x42,0x44,0x46,0x48,0x4a,0x4c,0x4e,0x50,0x52,0x54,0x56,0x58,0x5a,0x5c,0x5e,
0x60,0x62,0x64,0x66,0x68,0x6a,0x6c,0x6e,0x70,0x72,0x74,0x76,0x78,0x7a,0x7c,0x7e,
0x80,0x82,0x84,0x86,0x88,0x8a,0x8c,0x8e,0x90,0x92,0x94,0x96,0x98,0x9a,0x9c,0x9e,
0xa0,0xa2,0xa4,0xa6,0xa8,0xaa,0xac,0xae,0xb0,0xb2,0xb4,0xb6,0xb8,0xba,0xbc,0xbe,
0xc0,0xc2,0xc4,0xc6,0xc8,0xca,0xcc,0xce,0xd0,0xd2,0xd4,0xd6,0xd8,0xda,0xdc,0xde,
0xe0,0xe2,0xe4,0xe6,0xe8,0xea,0xec,0xee,0xf0,0xf2,0xf4,0xf6,0xf8,0xfa,0xfc,0xfe,
0x1b,0x19,0x1f,0x1d,0x13,0x11,0x17,0x15,0x0b,0x09,0x0f,0x0d,0x03,0x01,0x07,0x05,
0x3b,0x39,0x3f,0x3d,0x33,0x31,0x37,0x35,0x2b,0x29,0x2f,0x2d,0x23,0x21,0x27,0x25,
0x5b,0x59,0x5f,0x5d,0x53,0x51,0x57,0x55,0x4b,0x49,0x4f,0x4d,0x43,0x41,0x47,0x45,
0x7b,0x79,0x7f,0x7d,0x73,0x71,0x77,0x75,0x6b,0x69,0x6f,0x6d,0x63,0x61,0x67,0x65,
0x9b,0x99,0x9f,0x9d,0x93,0x91,0x97,0x95,0x8b,0x89,0x8f,0x8d,0x83,0x81,0x87,0x85,
0xbb,0xb9,0xbf,0xbd,0xb3,0xb1,0xb7,0xb5,0xab,0xa9,0xaf,0xad,0xa3,0xa1,0xa7,0xa5,
0xdb,0xd9,0xdf,0xdd,0xd3,0xd1,0xd7,0xd5,0xcb,0xc9,0xcf,0xcd,0xc3,0xc1,0xc7,0xc5,
0xfb,0xf9,0xff,0xfd,0xf3,0xf1,0xf7,0xf5,0xeb,0xe9,0xef,0xed,0xe3,0xe1,0xe7,0xe5

Multiply by 3:

0x00,0x03,0x06,0x05,0x0c,0x0f,0x0a,0x09,0x18,0x1b,0x1e,0x1d,0x14,0x17,0x12,0x11,
0x30,0x33,0x36,0x35,0x3c,0x3f,0x3a,0x39,0x28,0x2b,0x2e,0x2d,0x24,0x27,0x22,0x21,
0x60,0x63,0x66,0x65,0x6c,0x6f,0x6a,0x69,0x78,0x7b,0x7e,0x7d,0x74,0x77,0x72,0x71,
0x50,0x53,0x56,0x55,0x5c,0x5f,0x5a,0x59,0x48,0x4b,0x4e,0x4d,0x44,0x47,0x42,0x41,
0xc0,0xc3,0xc6,0xc5,0xcc,0xcf,0xca,0xc9,0xd8,0xdb,0xde,0xdd,0xd4,0xd7,0xd2,0xd1,
0xf0,0xf3,0xf6,0xf5,0xfc,0xff,0xfa,0xf9,0xe8,0xeb,0xee,0xed,0xe4,0xe7,0xe2,0xe1,
0xa0,0xa3,0xa6,0xa5,0xac,0xaf,0xaa,0xa9,0xb8,0xbb,0xbe,0xbd,0xb4,0xb7,0xb2,0xb1,
0x90,0x93,0x96,0x95,0x9c,0x9f,0x9a,0x99,0x88,0x8b,0x8e,0x8d,0x84,0x87,0x82,0x81,
0x9b,0x98,0x9d,0x9e,0x97,0x94,0x91,0x92,0x83,0x80,0x85,0x86,0x8f,0x8c,0x89,0x8a,
0xab,0xa8,0xad,0xae,0xa7,0xa4,0xa1,0xa2,0xb3,0xb0,0xb5,0xb6,0xbf,0xbc,0xb9,0xba,
0xfb,0xf8,0xfd,0xfe,0xf7,0xf4,0xf1,0xf2,0xe3,0xe0,0xe5,0xe6,0xef,0xec,0xe9,0xea,
0xcb,0xc8,0xcd,0xce,0xc7,0xc4,0xc1,0xc2,0xd3,0xd0,0xd5,0xd6,0xdf,0xdc,0xd9,0xda,
0x5b,0x58,0x5d,0x5e,0x57,0x54,0x51,0x52,0x43,0x40,0x45,0x46,0x4f,0x4c,0x49,0x4a,
0x6b,0x68,0x6d,0x6e,0x67,0x64,0x61,0x62,0x73,0x70,0x75,0x76,0x7f,0x7c,0x79,0x7a,
0x3b,0x38,0x3d,0x3e,0x37,0x34,0x31,0x32,0x23,0x20,0x25,0x26,0x2f,0x2c,0x29,0x2a,
0x0b,0x08,0x0d,0x0e,0x07,0x04,0x01,0x02,0x13,0x10,0x15,0x16,0x1f,0x1c,0x19,0x1a

Multiply by 9:

0x00,0x09,0x12,0x1b,0x24,0x2d,0x36,0x3f,0x48,0x41,0x5a,0x53,0x6c,0x65,0x7e,0x77,
0x90,0x99,0x82,0x8b,0xb4,0xbd,0xa6,0xaf,0xd8,0xd1,0xca,0xc3,0xfc,0xf5,0xee,0xe7,
0x3b,0x32,0x29,0x20,0x1f,0x16,0x0d,0x04,0x73,0x7a,0x61,0x68,0x57,0x5e,0x45,0x4c,
0xab,0xa2,0xb9,0xb0,0x8f,0x86,0x9d,0x94,0xe3,0xea,0xf1,0xf8,0xc7,0xce,0xd5,0xdc,
0x76,0x7f,0x64,0x6d,0x52,0x5b,0x40,0x49,0x3e,0x37,0x2c,0x25,0x1a,0x13,0x08,0x01,
0xe6,0xef,0xf4,0xfd,0xc2,0xcb,0xd0,0xd9,0xae,0xa7,0xbc,0xb5,0x8a,0x83,0x98,0x91,
0x4d,0x44,0x5f,0x56,0x69,0x60,0x7b,0x72,0x05,0x0c,0x17,0x1e,0x21,0x28,0x33,0x3a,
0xdd,0xd4,0xcf,0xc6,0xf9,0xf0,0xeb,0xe2,0x95,0x9c,0x87,0x8e,0xb1,0xb8,0xa3,0xaa,
0xec,0xe5,0xfe,0xf7,0xc8,0xc1,0xda,0xd3,0xa4,0xad,0xb6,0xbf,0x80,0x89,0x92,0x9b,
0x7c,0x75,0x6e,0x67,0x58,0x51,0x4a,0x43,0x34,0x3d,0x26,0x2f,0x10,0x19,0x02,0x0b,
0xd7,0xde,0xc5,0xcc,0xf3,0xfa,0xe1,0xe8,0x9f,0x96,0x8d,0x84,0xbb,0xb2,0xa9,0xa0,
0x47,0x4e,0x55,0x5c,0x63,0x6a,0x71,0x78,0x0f,0x06,0x1d,0x14,0x2b,0x22,0x39,0x30,
0x9a,0x93,0x88,0x81,0xbe,0xb7,0xac,0xa5,0xd2,0xdb,0xc0,0xc9,0xf6,0xff,0xe4,0xed,
0x0a,0x03,0x18,0x11,0x2e,0x27,0x3c,0x35,0x42,0x4b,0x50,0x59,0x66,0x6f,0x74,0x7d,
0xa1,0xa8,0xb3,0xba,0x85,0x8c,0x97,0x9e,0xe9,0xe0,0xfb,0xf2,0xcd,0xc4,0xdf,0xd6,
0x31,0x38,0x23,0x2a,0x15,0x1c,0x07,0x0e,0x79,0x70,0x6b,0x62,0x5d,0x54,0x4f,0x46

Multiply by 11 (0xB):

0x00,0x0b,0x16,0x1d,0x2c,0x27,0x3a,0x31,0x58,0x53,0x4e,0x45,0x74,0x7f,0x62,0x69,
0xb0,0xbb,0xa6,0xad,0x9c,0x97,0x8a,0x81,0xe8,0xe3,0xfe,0xf5,0xc4,0xcf,0xd2,0xd9,
0x7b,0x70,0x6d,0x66,0x57,0x5c,0x41,0x4a,0x23,0x28,0x35,0x3e,0x0f,0x04,0x19,0x12,
0xcb,0xc0,0xdd,0xd6,0xe7,0xec,0xf1,0xfa,0x93,0x98,0x85,0x8e,0xbf,0xb4,0xa9,0xa2,
0xf6,0xfd,0xe0,0xeb,0xda,0xd1,0xcc,0xc7,0xae,0xa5,0xb8,0xb3,0x82,0x89,0x94,0x9f,
0x46,0x4d,0x50,0x5b,0x6a,0x61,0x7c,0x77,0x1e,0x15,0x08,0x03,0x32,0x39,0x24,0x2f,
0x8d,0x86,0x9b,0x90,0xa1,0xaa,0xb7,0xbc,0xd5,0xde,0xc3,0xc8,0xf9,0xf2,0xef,0xe4,
0x3d,0x36,0x2b,0x20,0x11,0x1a,0x07,0x0c,0x65,0x6e,0x73,0x78,0x49,0x42,0x5f,0x54,
0xf7,0xfc,0xe1,0xea,0xdb,0xd0,0xcd,0xc6,0xaf,0xa4,0xb9,0xb2,0x83,0x88,0x95,0x9e,
0x47,0x4c,0x51,0x5a,0x6b,0x60,0x7d,0x76,0x1f,0x14,0x09,0x02,0x33,0x38,0x25,0x2e,
0x8c,0x87,0x9a,0x91,0xa0,0xab,0xb6,0xbd,0xd4,0xdf,0xc2,0xc9,0xf8,0xf3,0xee,0xe5,
0x3c,0x37,0x2a,0x21,0x10,0x1b,0x06,0x0d,0x64,0x6f,0x72,0x79,0x48,0x43,0x5e,0x55,
0x01,0x0a,0x17,0x1c,0x2d,0x26,0x3b,0x30,0x59,0x52,0x4f,0x44,0x75,0x7e,0x63,0x68,
0xb1,0xba,0xa7,0xac,0x9d,0x96,0x8b,0x80,0xe9,0xe2,0xff,0xf4,0xc5,0xce,0xd3,0xd8,
0x7a,0x71,0x6c,0x67,0x56,0x5d,0x40,0x4b,0x22,0x29,0x34,0x3f,0x0e,0x05,0x18,0x13,
0xca,0xc1,0xdc,0xd7,0xe6,0xed,0xf0,0xfb,0x92,0x99,0x84,0x8f,0xbe,0xb5,0xa8,0xa3

Multiply by 13 (0xD):

0x00,0x0d,0x1a,0x17,0x34,0x39,0x2e,0x23,0x68,0x65,0x72,0x7f,0x5c,0x51,0x46,0x4b,
0xd0,0xdd,0xca,0xc7,0xe4,0xe9,0xfe,0xf3,0xb8,0xb5,0xa2,0xaf,0x8c,0x81,0x96,0x9b,
0xbb,0xb6,0xa1,0xac,0x8f,0x82,0x95,0x98,0xd3,0xde,0xc9,0xc4,0xe7,0xea,0xfd,0xf0,
0x6b,0x66,0x71,0x7c,0x5f,0x52,0x45,0x48,0x03,0x0e,0x19,0x14,0x37,0x3a,0x2d,0x20,
0x6d,0x60,0x77,0x7a,0x59,0x54,0x43,0x4e,0x05,0x08,0x1f,0x12,0x31,0x3c,0x2b,0x26,
0xbd,0xb0,0xa7,0xaa,0x89,0x84,0x93,0x9e,0xd5,0xd8,0xcf,0xc2,0xe1,0xec,0xfb,0xf6,
0xd6,0xdb,0xcc,0xc1,0xe2,0xef,0xf8,0xf5,0xbe,0xb3,0xa4,0xa9,0x8a,0x87,0x90,0x9d,
0x06,0x0b,0x1c,0x11,0x32,0x3f,0x28,0x25,0x6e,0x63,0x74,0x79,0x5a,0x57,0x40,0x4d,
0xda,0xd7,0xc0,0xcd,0xee,0xe3,0xf4,0xf9,0xb2,0xbf,0xa8,0xa5,0x86,0x8b,0x9c,0x91,
0x0a,0x07,0x10,0x1d,0x3e,0x33,0x24,0x29,0x62,0x6f,0x78,0x75,0x56,0x5b,0x4c,0x41,
0x61,0x6c,0x7b,0x76,0x55,0x58,0x4f,0x42,0x09,0x04,0x13,0x1e,0x3d,0x30,0x27,0x2a,
0xb1,0xbc,0xab,0xa6,0x85,0x88,0x9f,0x92,0xd9,0xd4,0xc3,0xce,0xed,0xe0,0xf7,0xfa,
0xb7,0xba,0xad,0xa0,0x83,0x8e,0x99,0x94,0xdf,0xd2,0xc5,0xc8,0xeb,0xe6,0xf1,0xfc,
0x67,0x6a,0x7d,0x70,0x53,0x5e,0x49,0x44,0x0f,0x02,0x15,0x18,0x3b,0x36,0x21,0x2c,
0x0c,0x01,0x16,0x1b,0x38,0x35,0x22,0x2f,0x64,0x69,0x7e,0x73,0x50,0x5d,0x4a,0x47,
0xdc,0xd1,0xc6,0xcb,0xe8,0xe5,0xf2,0xff,0xb4,0xb9,0xae,0xa3,0x80,0x8d,0x9a,0x97

Multiply by 14 (0xE):

0x00,0x0e,0x1c,0x12,0x38,0x36,0x24,0x2a,0x70,0x7e,0x6c,0x62,0x48,0x46,0x54,0x5a,
0xe0,0xee,0xfc,0xf2,0xd8,0xd6,0xc4,0xca,0x90,0x9e,0x8c,0x82,0xa8,0xa6,0xb4,0xba,
0xdb,0xd5,0xc7,0xc9,0xe3,0xed,0xff,0xf1,0xab,0xa5,0xb7,0xb9,0x93,0x9d,0x8f,0x81,
0x3b,0x35,0x27,0x29,0x03,0x0d,0x1f,0x11,0x4b,0x45,0x57,0x59,0x73,0x7d,0x6f,0x61,
0xad,0xa3,0xb1,0xbf,0x95,0x9b,0x89,0x87,0xdd,0xd3,0xc1,0xcf,0xe5,0xeb,0xf9,0xf7,
0x4d,0x43,0x51,0x5f,0x75,0x7b,0x69,0x67,0x3d,0x33,0x21,0x2f,0x05,0x0b,0x19,0x17,
0x76,0x78,0x6a,0x64,0x4e,0x40,0x52,0x5c,0x06,0x08,0x1a,0x14,0x3e,0x30,0x22,0x2c,
0x96,0x98,0x8a,0x84,0xae,0xa0,0xb2,0xbc,0xe6,0xe8,0xfa,0xf4,0xde,0xd0,0xc2,0xcc,
0x41,0x4f,0x5d,0x53,0x79,0x77,0x65,0x6b,0x31,0x3f,0x2d,0x23,0x09,0x07,0x15,0x1b,
0xa1,0xaf,0xbd,0xb3,0x99,0x97,0x85,0x8b,0xd1,0xdf,0xcd,0xc3,0xe9,0xe7,0xf5,0xfb,
0x9a,0x94,0x86,0x88,0xa2,0xac,0xbe,0xb0,0xea,0xe4,0xf6,0xf8,0xd2,0xdc,0xce,0xc0,
0x7a,0x74,0x66,0x68,0x42,0x4c,0x5e,0x50,0x0a,0x04,0x16,0x18,0x32,0x3c,0x2e,0x20,
0xec,0xe2,0xf0,0xfe,0xd4,0xda,0xc8,0xc6,0x9c,0x92,0x80,0x8e,0xa4,0xaa,0xb8,0xb6,
0x0c,0x02,0x10,0x1e,0x34,0x3a,0x28,0x26,0x7c,0x72,0x60,0x6e,0x44,0x4a,0x58,0x56,
0x37,0x39,0x2b,0x25,0x0f,0x01,0x13,0x1d,0x47,0x49,0x5b,0x55,0x7f,0x71,0x63,0x6d,
0xd7,0xd9,0xcb,0xc5,0xef,0xe1,0xf3,0xfd,0xa7,0xa9,0xbb,0xb5,0x9f,0x91,0x83,0x8d
