= AES key schedule =

Method for expanding key to round keys in AES

The Advanced Encryption Standard uses a key schedule to expand a short key into a number of separate round keys. The three AES variants have a different number of rounds. Each variant requires a separate 128-bit round key for each round plus one more. (Note: Non-AES Rijndael variants require up to 256 bits of expanded key per round) The key schedule produces the needed round keys from the initial key.

== Round constants ==
Values of rc_{i} in hexadecimal
| i | 1 | 2 | 3 | 4 | 5 | 6 | 7 | 8 | 9 | 10 |
| rc_{i} | 01 | 02 | 04 | 08 | 10 | 20 | 40 | 80 | 1B | 36 |

The round constant rcon_{i} for round i of the key expansion is the 32-bit word: (Note: In FIPS-197 the $rc_i$ value is the least significant byte at index 0)

$$rcon_i = \begin{bmatrix} rc_i & 00_{16} & 00_{16} & 00_{16} \end{bmatrix}$$

where rc_{i} is an eight-bit value defined as :

$$rc_i =
\begin{cases}
1 & \text{if } i = 1 \\
2 \cdot rc_{i-1} & \text{if } i > 1 \text{ and } rc_{i-1} < 80_{16} \\
(((2 \cdot rc_{i-1})  \oplus \text {11B}_{16} ) \text{ mod } \text {100}_{16} ) & \text{if } i > 1 \text{ and } rc_{i-1} \ge 80_{16}
\end{cases}$$

where $\oplus$ is the bitwise XOR operator and constants such as 00_{16} and 11B_{16} are given in hexadecimal. Equivalently:

$$rc_i = x^{i-1}$$

where the bits of rc_{i} are treated as the coefficients of an element of the finite field $\rm{GF}(2)[x]/(x^8 + x^4 + x^3 + x + 1)$, so that e.g. $rc_{10} = 36_{16} = 00110110_2$ represents the polynomial $x^5 + x^4 + x^2 + x$.

AES uses up to rcon_{10} for AES-128 (as 11 round keys are needed), up to rcon_{8} for AES-192, and up to rcon_{7} for AES-256. (Note: The Rijndael variants with larger block sizes use more of these constants, up to rcon_{29} for Rijndael with 128-bit keys and 256 bit blocks (needs 15 round keys of each 256 bit, which means 30 full rounds of key expansion, which means 29 calls to the key schedule core using the round constants). The remaining constants for i ≥ 11 are: 6C, D8, AB, 4D, 9A, 2F, 5E, BC, 63, C6, 97, 35, 6A, D4, B3, 7D, FA, EF and C5)

== The key schedule ==
AES key schedule for a 128-bit key.

Define:

- N as the length of the key in 32-bit words: 4 words for AES-128, 6 words for AES-192, and 8 words for AES-256
- K_{0}, K_{1}, ... K_{N-1} as the 32-bit words of the original key
- R as the number of round keys needed: 11 round keys for AES-128, 13 keys for AES-192, and 15 keys for AES-256 (Note: Other Rijndael variants require max(N, B) + 7 round keys, where B is the block size in words)
- W_{0}, W_{1}, ... W_{4R-1} as the 32-bit words of the expanded key (Note: Other Rijndael variants require BR words of expanded key, where B is the block size in words)

Also define RotWord as a one-byte left circular shift: (Note: Rotation is opposite of byte order direction. FIPS-197 byte addresses in arrays are increasing from left to right in little endian but rotation is from right to left. In AES-NI and in the Linux kernel's lib/crypto/aes.c, the byte ordering is increasing from right to left in little endian but rotation is from left to right.)

$$\operatorname{RotWord}(\begin{bmatrix} b_0 & b_1 & b_2 & b_3 \end{bmatrix}) = \begin{bmatrix} b_1 & b_2 & b_3 & b_0 \end{bmatrix}$$

and SubWord as an application of the AES S-box to each of the four bytes of the word:

$$\operatorname{SubWord}(\begin{bmatrix} b_0 & b_1 & b_2 & b_3 \end{bmatrix}) = \begin{bmatrix} \operatorname{S}(b_0) & \operatorname{S}(b_1) & \operatorname{S}(b_2) & \operatorname{S}(b_3) \end{bmatrix}$$

Then for $i = 0 \ldots 4R-1$:

$$W_i =
\begin{cases}
K_i & \text{if } i < N \\
W_{i-N} \oplus \operatorname{SubWord}(\operatorname{RotWord}(W_{i-1})) \oplus rcon_{i/N} & \text {if } i \ge N \text{ and } i \equiv 0 \pmod{N} \\
W_{i-N} \oplus \operatorname{SubWord}(W_{i-1}) & \text{if } i \ge N \text{, } N > 6 \text{, and } i \equiv 4 \pmod{N} \\
W_{i-N} \oplus W_{i-1} & \text{otherwise.} \\
\end{cases}$$
