= Encryption by date =

This is a timeline of the public releases or introductions of computer encryption algorithms.

Cipher	Year	Key size	Block size	Rounds
Lucifer	1971	48		various
New Data Seal	1975	2048	128	16
DES-X	1976	184		
DES	1977	56	64	16
GDES	1981		32	
Madryga	1984			
NewDES	1985	120	64	17
Multi2	1988	64	64	various
Khufu	1989	512	64	16
LOKI97	1989	64	64	16
FEAL	1990	64	64	"4,8,32"
Redoc	1990	160	160	?
IDEA	1991	128	64	8.5
BassOmatic	1991	8 to 2048	2048	1 to 8
CMEA	1991	64	16-64	3
Blowfish	1993	1-448	64	16
Crab	1993	80	8192	
MMB	1993	128	128	6
SAFER	1993	64	128	?
SXAL/MBAL	1993	64	64	8
RC5	1994	0-2040	32/64/128	1-255
TEA	1994	128	64	"64,32"
3-Way	1994	96	96	11
BaseKing	1994	192	192	11
GOST	1994	256	64	32
Ladder-DES	1994	224	128	4
MacGuffin	1994	128	64	32
RC4	1994	42-48	2064	256
BATON	1995	320	96128	
KN-Cipher	1995	198	64	6
Misty1	1995	128	64	4*n
S-1	1995	hoax	hoax	hoax
CAST-128	1996	40/128	64	12 or 16
RC2	1996	8-128	64	16
Akelarre	1996	128	128	4
Shark	1996	128	64	6
Red Pike	1996	64	64	?
XTEA	1997	128	64	"64,32"
ICE	1997	64	64	"16,8"
M6	1997	40-64	64	10
Square	1997	128	128	8
Treyfer	1997	64	64	32
xmx	1997	variable	key size	variable even
AES	1998	128/192/256	128	10/12/2014
Triple DES	1998	168/112/56	64	48
Serpent	1998	128/192/256	128	32
Twofish	1998	128/192/256	128	16
SEED	1998	128	128	16
Skipjack	1998	80	64	32
CAST-256	1998	"128,160,192,224,256"	128	48
CIPHERUNICORN-E	1998	128	64	16
Coconut98	1998	256	64	8
Crypton	1998	128,192,256	128	12
CS-Cipher	1998	128	64	8
DEAL	1998	128/192/256	128	"6,8"
DFC	1998	128/192/256	128	8
E2	1998	128/192/256	128	12
FROG	1998	128/192/256	128	8
LOKI97	1998	128/192/256	128	16
Magenta	1998	128/192/256	128	"6,8"
MARS	1998	128/192/256	128	32
RC6	1998	128/192/256	128	20
xxtea	1998	128	64	various
M8	1999	64		10
MultiSwap	1999	374	64	
UES	1999	128/192/256	128	48
Camellia	2000	128/192/256	128	18 or 24
Anubis	2000	128320	128	12+
CIPHERUNICORN-A	2000	128/192/256	128	16
Hierocrypt	2000	128	64	6.5
Kasumi	2000			
Khazad	2000	128	64	8
Mercy	2000	128	4096	6
Nimbus	2000	128	64	5
Noekeon	2000	128	128	128
NUSH	2000	128/192/256	64128256	"9,17,33"
Q	2000	128/192/256	128	8 or 9
SC2000	2000	128/192/256	128	"6.5,7.5"
Zodiac	2000	128/192/256	128	16
FEA-M	2001	4094	4096	1
Shacal	2001	128 to 512	"160, 256"	80
Spectr-H64	2001	256	64	12
ABC	2002	512	256	17
CIKS-1	2002	256	64	8
MESH	2002	128/192/256	"64, 96,128"	"8.5,10.5,12.5"
ARIA	2003	128/192/256	128	"12,14,16"
Cryptomeria cipher	2003	56	64	10
Idea NXT	2003	0-256	64128	16
SMS4	2006	128	128	32
CLEFIA (Sony)	2007	128/192/256	128	"18,22,26"
Threefish	2008	"256,512,1024"	"256,512,1024"	72
BEAR/LION	?		2^13 to 2^23	3
Libelle	?	64	160	"1,8,16,32,64"
KeeLoq	1990s			
Hasty Pudding Cipher	1998–2006	0-513+	varies	
Saville	1999?	128	?	?
Intel Cascade Cipher	2005?	128	128	"10,32"
Cobra	2007?	?	?	?
