= Cipher security summary =

Attacks against common ciphers

This article summarizes publicly known attacks against block ciphers and stream ciphers. Note that there are perhaps attacks that are not publicly known, and not all entries may be up to date.

== Table color key ==
No known successful attacks — attack only breaks a reduced version of the cipher
Theoretical break — attack breaks all rounds and has lower complexity than security claim
Attack demonstrated in practice

== Best attack ==
This column lists the complexity of the attack:

- If the attack doesn't break the full cipher, "rounds" refers to how many rounds were broken
- "time" — time complexity, number of cipher evaluations for the attacker
- "data" — required known plaintext-ciphertext pairs (if applicable)
- "memory" — how many blocks worth of data needs to be stored (if applicable)
- "related keys" — for related-key attacks, how many related key queries are needed

== Common ciphers ==
=== Key or plaintext recovery attacks ===
Attacks that lead to disclosure of the key or plaintext.

Cipher	Security claim	Best attack	Publish date	Comment
AES128	2^{128}	2^{126.1} time, 2^{88} data, 2^{8} memory	2011-08-17	Independent biclique attack.
AES192	2^{192}	2^{189.7} time, 2^{80} data, 2^{8} memory	2011-08-17	Independent biclique attack.
AES256	2^{256}	2^{254.4} time, 2^{40} data, 2^{8} memory	2011-08-17	Independent biclique attack.
Blowfish	Up to 2^{448}	4 of 16 rounds; 64-bit block is vulnerable to SWEET32 attack.	2016	Differential cryptanalysis. Author of Blowfish (Bruce Schneier) recommends using Twofish instead. SWEET32 attack demonstrated birthday attacks to recover plaintext with its 64-bit block size, vulnerable to protocols such as TLS, SSH, IPsec, and OpenVPN, without attacking the cipher itself.
Twofish	2^{128} – 2^{256}	6 of 16 rounds (2^{256} time)	1999-10-05	Impossible differential attack.
Serpent-128	2^{128}	10 of 32 rounds (2^{89} time, 2^{118} data)	2002-02-04	Linear cryptanalysis.
Serpent-192	2^{192}	11 of 32 rounds (2^{187} time, 2^{118} data)	2002-02-04	Linear cryptanalysis.
Serpent-256	2^{256}	11 of 32 rounds (2^{187} time, 2^{118} data)	2002-02-04	Linear cryptanalysis.
DES	2^{56}	2^{39} – 2^{43} time, 2^{43} known plaintexts	2001	Linear cryptanalysis. In addition, broken by brute force in 2^{56} time, no later than 1998-07-17, see EFF DES cracker. Cracking hardware is available for purchase since 2006.
Triple DES	2^{168}	2^{113} time, 2^{32} data, 2^{88} memory; 64-bit block is vulnerable to SWEET32 attack.	2016	Extension of the meet-in-the-middle attack. Time complexity is 2^{113} steps, but along with proposed techniques, it is estimated to be equivalent to 2^{90} single DES encryption steps. The paper also proposes other time–memory tradeoffs. SWEET32 attack demonstrated birthday attacks to recover plaintext with its 64-bit block size, vulnerable to protocols such as TLS, SSH, IPsec, and OpenVPN.
KASUMI	2^{128}	2^{32} time, 2^{26} data, 2^{30} memory, 4 related keys	2010-01-10	The cipher used in 3G cell phone networks. This attack takes less than two hours on a single PC, but isn't applicable to 3G due to known plaintext and related key requirements.
RC4	unpublished	2^{20} time, 2^{16.4} related keys (95% success probability)	2007	Commonly known as PTW attack, it can break WEP encryption in Wi-Fi on an ordinary computer in negligible time. This is an improvement of the original Fluhrer, Mantin and Shamir attack published in 2001.

=== Distinguishing attacks ===
Attacks that allow distinguishing ciphertext from random data.

Cipher	Security claim	Best attack	Publish date	Comment
RC4	unpublished	?? time, 2^{30.6} bytes data (90% probability)	2000	Paper.

== Less-common ciphers ==
=== Key recovery attacks ===
Attacks that lead to disclosure of the key.

Cipher	Security claim	Best attack	Publish date	Comment
CAST (not CAST-128)	2^{64}	2^{48} time, 2^{17} chosen plaintexts	1997-11-11	Related-key attack.
CAST-128	2^{128}	6 of 16 rounds (2^{88.51} time, 2^{53.96} data)	2009-08-23	Known-plaintext linear cryptanalysis.
CAST-256	2^{256}	24 of 48 rounds (2^{156.2} time, 2^{124.1} data)	2009-08-23	Known-plaintext linear cryptanalysis.
IDEA	2^{128}	2^{126.1} time	2012-04-15	Narrow-biclique attack.
MISTY1	2^{128}	2^{69.5} time, 2^{64} chosen plaintexts	2015-07-30	Chosen-ciphertext, integral cryptanalysis, an improvement over a previous chosen-plaintext attack.
RC2	2^{64} – 2^{128}	Unknown time, 2^{34} chosen plaintexts	1997-11-11	Related-key attack.
RC5	2^{128}	Unknown		
SEED	2^{128}	Unknown		
Skipjack	2^{80}	2^{80}		ECRYPT II recommendations note that, as of 2012, 80 bit ciphers provide only "Very short-term protection against agencies". NIST recommends not to use Skipjack after 2010.
TEA	2^{128}	2^{32} time, 2^{23} chosen plaintexts	1997-11-11	Related-key attack.
XTEA	2^{128}	Unknown		
XXTEA	2^{128}	2^{59} chosen plaintexts	2010-05-04	Chosen-plaintext, differential cryptanalysis.

=== Distinguishing attacks ===
Attacks that allow distinguishing ciphertext from random data.

Cipher	Security claim	Best attack	Publish date	Comment
CAST-256	2^{256}	28 of 48 rounds (2^{246.9} time, 2^{68} memory, 2^{98.8} data)	2012-12-04	Multidimensional zero-correlation cryptanalysis.

== See also ==
- Block cipher
- Hash function security summary
- Time/memory/data tradeoff attack
- Transport Layer Security
- Bullrun (decryption program) — a secret anti-encryption program run by the U.S. National Security Agency
