= Truncated differential cryptanalysis =

Form of cryptanalaysis

In cryptography, truncated differential cryptanalysis is a generalization of differential cryptanalysis, an attack against block ciphers. Lars Knudsen developed the technique in 1994. Whereas ordinary differential cryptanalysis analyzes the full difference between two texts, the truncated variant considers differences that are only partially determined. That is, the attack makes predictions of only some of the bits instead of the full block. This technique has been applied to SAFER, IDEA, Skipjack, E2, Twofish, Camellia, CRYPTON, and even the stream cipher Salsa20.
