= Strong cryptography =

Term applied to cryptographic systems that are highly resistant to cryptanalysis

Strong cryptography or cryptographically strong are general terms used to designate the cryptographic algorithms that, when used correctly, provide a very high (usually insurmountable) level of protection against any eavesdropper, including the government agencies. There is no precise definition of the boundary line between the strong cryptography and (breakable) weak cryptography, as this border constantly shifts due to improvements in hardware and cryptanalysis techniques. These improvements eventually place the capabilities once available only to the NSA within the reach of a skilled individual, so in practice there are only two levels of cryptographic security, "cryptography that will stop your kid sister from reading your files, and cryptography that will stop major governments from reading your files" (Bruce Schneier).

The strong cryptography algorithms have high security strength, for practical purposes usually defined as a number of bits in the key. For example, the United States government, when dealing with export control of encryption, considered as of 1999 any implementation of the symmetric encryption algorithm with the key length above 56 bits or its public key equivalent to be strong and thus potentially subject to the export licensing. To be strong, an algorithm needs to have a sufficiently long key and be free of known mathematical weaknesses, as exploitation of these effectively reduces the key size. At the beginning of the 21st century, the typical security strength of the strong symmetrical encryption algorithms is 128 bits (slightly lower values still can be strong, but usually there is little technical gain in using smaller key sizes).

Demonstrating the resistance of any cryptographic scheme to attack is a complex matter, requiring extensive testing and reviews, preferably in a public forum. Good algorithms and protocols are required (similarly, good materials are required to construct a strong building), but good system design and implementation is needed as well: "it is possible to build a cryptographically weak system using strong algorithms and protocols" (just like the use of good materials in construction does not guarantee a solid structure). Many real-life systems turn out to be weak when the strong cryptography is not used properly, for example, random nonces are reused A successful attack might not even involve algorithm at all, for example, if the key is generated from a password, guessing a weak password is easy and does not depend on the strength of the cryptographic primitives. A user can become the weakest link in the overall picture, for example, by sharing passwords and hardware tokens with colleagues.

== Background ==
The level of expense required for strong cryptography originally restricted its use to the government and military agencies, until the middle of the 20th century the process of encryption required a lot of human labor and errors (preventing the decryption) were very common, so only a small share of written information could have been encrypted. US government, in particular, was able to keep a monopoly on the development and use of cryptography in the US into the 1960s. In the 1970, the increased availability of powerful computers and unclassified research breakthroughs (Data Encryption Standard, the Diffie-Hellman and RSA algorithms) made strong cryptography available for civilian use. Mid-1990s saw the worldwide proliferation of knowledge and tools for strong cryptography. By the 21st century the technical limitations were gone, although the majority of the communication were still unencrypted. At the same the cost of building and running systems with strong cryptography became roughly the same as the one for the weak cryptography.

The use of computers changed the process of cryptanalysis, famously with Bletchley Park's Colossus. But just as the development of digital computers and electronics helped in cryptanalysis, it also made possible much more complex ciphers. It is typically the case that use of a quality cipher is very efficient, while breaking it requires an effort many orders of magnitude larger - making cryptanalysis so inefficient and impractical as to be effectively impossible.

== Cryptographically strong algorithms ==
This term "cryptographically strong" is often used to describe an encryption algorithm, and implies, in comparison to some other algorithm (which is thus cryptographically weak), greater resistance to attack. But it can also be used to describe hashing and unique identifier and filename creation algorithms. See for example the description of the Microsoft .NET runtime library function Path.GetRandomFileName. In this usage, the term means "difficult to guess".

An encryption algorithm is intended to be unbreakable (in which case it is as strong as it can ever be), but might be breakable (in which case it is as weak as it can ever be) so there is not, in principle, a continuum of strength as the idiom would seem to imply: Algorithm A is stronger than Algorithm B which is stronger than Algorithm C, and so on. The situation is made more complex, and less subsumable into a single strength metric, by the fact that there are many types of cryptanalytic attack and that any given algorithm is likely to force the attacker to do more work to break it when using one attack than another.

There is only one known unbreakable cryptographic system, the one-time pad, which is not generally possible to use because of the difficulties involved in exchanging one-time pads without them being compromised. So any encryption algorithm can be compared to the perfect algorithm, the one-time pad.

The usual sense in which this term is (loosely) used, is in reference to a particular attack, brute force key search — especially in explanations for newcomers to the field. Indeed, with this attack (always assuming keys to have been randomly chosen), there is a continuum of resistance depending on the length of the key used. But even so there are two major problems: many algorithms allow use of different length keys at different times, and any algorithm can forgo use of the full key length possible. Thus, Blowfish and RC5 are block cipher algorithms whose design specifically allowed for several key lengths, and who cannot therefore be said to have any particular strength with respect to brute force key search. Furthermore, US export regulations restrict key length for exportable cryptographic products and in several cases in the 1980s and 1990s (e.g., famously in the case of Lotus Notes' export approval) only partial keys were used, decreasing 'strength' against brute force attack for those (export) versions. More or less the same thing happened outside the US as well, as for example in the case of more than one of the cryptographic algorithms in the GSM cellular telephone standard.

The term is commonly used to convey that some algorithm is suitable for some task in cryptography or information security, but also resists cryptanalysis and has no, or fewer, security weaknesses. Tasks are varied, and might include:

- generating randomness
- encrypting data
- providing a method to ensure data integrity

Cryptographically strong would seem to mean that the described method has some kind of maturity, perhaps even approved for use against different kinds of systematic attacks in theory and/or practice. Indeed, that the method may resist those attacks long enough to protect the information carried (and what stands behind the information) for a useful length of time. But due to the complexity and subtlety of the field, neither is almost ever the case. Since such assurances are not actually available in real practice, sleight of hand in language which implies that they are will generally be misleading.

There will always be uncertainty as advances (e.g., in cryptanalytic theory or merely affordable computer capacity) may reduce the effort needed to successfully use some attack method against an algorithm.

In addition, actual use of cryptographic algorithms requires their encapsulation in a cryptosystem, and doing so often introduces vulnerabilities which are not due to faults in an algorithm. For example, essentially all algorithms require random choice of keys, and any cryptosystem which does not provide such keys will be subject to attack regardless of any attack resistant qualities of the encryption algorithm(s) used.

== Legal issues ==
Widespread use of encryption increases the costs of surveillance, so the government policies aim to regulate the use of the strong cryptography. In the 2000s, the effect of encryption on the surveillance capabilities was limited by the ever-increasing share of communications going through the global social media platforms, that did not use the strong encryption and provided governments with the requested data. Murphy talks about a legislative balance that needs to be struck between the power of the government that are broad enough to be able to follow the quickly-evolving technology, yet sufficiently narrow for the public and overseeing agencies to understand the future use of the legislation.

=== USA ===
The initial response of the US government to the expanded availability of cryptography was to treat the cryptographic research in the same way the atomic energy research is, i.e., "born classified", with the government exercising the legal control of dissemination of research results. This had quickly found to be impossible, and the efforts were switched to the control over deployment (export, as prohibition on the deployment of cryptography within the US was not seriously considered).

The export control in the US historically uses two tracks:

- military items (designated as "munitions", although in practice the items on the United States Munitions List do not match the common meaning of this word). The export of munitions is controlled ty the Department of State. The restrictions for the munitions are very tight, with individual export licenses specifying the product and the actual customer;
- dual-use items ("commodities") need to be commercially available without excessive paperwork, so, depending on the destination, broad permissions can be granted for sales to civilian customers. The licensing for the dual-use items is provided by the Department of Commerce. The process of moving an item from the munition list to commodity status is handled by the Department of State.

Since the original applications of cryptography were almost exclusively military, it was placed on the munitions list. With the growth of the civilian uses, the dual-use cryptography was defined by cryptographic strength, with the strong encryption remaining a munition in a similar way to the guns (small arms are dual-use while artillery is of purely military value). This classification had its obvious drawbacks: a major bank is arguably just as systemically important as a military installation, and restriction on publishing the strong cryptography code run against the First Amendment, so after experimenting in 1993 with the Clipper chip (where the US government kept special decryption keys in escrow), in 1996 almost all cryptographic items were transferred to the Department of Commerce.

=== EU ===
The position of the EU, in comparison to the US, had always been tilting more towards privacy. In particular, EU had rejected the key escrow idea as early as 1997. European Union Agency for Cybersecurity (ENISA) holds the opinion that the backdoors are not efficient for the legitimate surveillance, yet pose great danger to the general digital security.

=== Five Eyes ===
The Five Eyes (post-Brexit) represent a group of states with similar views one the issues of security and privacy. The group might have enough heft to drive the global agenda on the lawful interception. The efforts of this group are not entirely coordinated: for example, the 2019 demand for Facebook not to implement end-to-end encryption was not supported by either Canada or New Zealand, and did not result in a regulation.

=== Russia ===
President and government of Russia in 90s has issued a few decrees formally banning uncertified cryptosystems from use by government agencies. Presidential decree of 1995 also attempted to ban individuals from producing and selling cryptography systems without having appropriate license, but it wasn't enforced in any way as it was suspected to be contradictory the Russian Constitution of 1993 and wasn't a law per se. (Note: The sources provided here are in Russian. To alleviate the problem of lack of English-written ones the sources are cited by using official government documents.) The decree of No.313 issued in 2012 further amended previous ones allowing to produce and distribute products with embedded cryptosystems and requiring no license as such, even though it declares some restrictions.

== Examples ==
=== Strong ===
- PGP is generally considered an example of strong cryptography, with versions running under most popular operating systems and on various hardware platforms. The open source standard for PGP operations is OpenPGP, and GnuPG is an implementation of that standard from the FSF. However, the IDEA signature key in classical PGP is only 64 bits long, therefore no longer immune to collision attacks. OpenPGP therefore uses the SHA-2 hash function and AES cryptography.
- The AES algorithm is considered strong after being selected in a lengthy selection process that was open and involved numerous tests.
- Elliptic curve cryptography is another system which is based on a graphical geometrical function.
- The latest version of TLS protocol (version 1.3), used to secure Internet transactions, is generally considered strong. Several vulnerabilities exist in previous versions, including demonstrated attacks such as POODLE. Worse, some cipher-suites are deliberately weakened to use a 40-bit effective key to allow export under pre-1996 U.S. regulations.

=== Weak ===
Examples that are not considered cryptographically strong include:

- The DES, whose 56-bit keys allow attacks via exhaustive search.
- Triple-DES (3DES / EDE3-DES) can be subject of the "SWEET32 Birthday attack"
- Wired Equivalent Privacy which is subject to a number of attacks due to flaws in its design.
- SSL v2 and v3. TLS 1.0 and TLS 1.1 are also deprecated now [see RFC7525] because of irreversible flaws which are still present by design and because they do not provide elliptical handshake (EC) for ciphers, no modern cryptography, no CCM/GCM ciphermodes. TLS1.x are also announced off by the PCIDSS 3.2 for commercial business/banking implementations on web frontends. Only TLS1.2 and TLS 1.3 are allowed and recommended, modern ciphers, handshakes and ciphermodes must be used exclusively.
- The MD5 and SHA-1 hash functions, no longer immune to collision attacks.
- The RC4 stream cipher.
- The 40-bit Content Scramble System used to encrypt most DVD-Video discs.
- Almost all classical ciphers.
- Most rotary ciphers, such as the Enigma machine.
- DHE/EDHE is guessable/weak when using/re-using known default prime values on the server

== Sources ==
- Vagle, Jeffrey L. (2015). "Furtive Encryption: Power, Trusts, and the Constitutional Cost of Collective Surveillance". Indiana Law Journal. 90 (1).
- Reinhold, Arnold G. (September 17, 1999). Strong Cryptography The Global Tide of Change. Cato Institute Briefing Papers No. 51. Cato Institute.
- Diffie, Whitfield; Landau, Susan (2007). "The export of cryptography in the 20th and the 21st centuries". The History of Information Security. Elsevier. pp. 725–736. doi:10.1016/b978-044451608-4/50027-4. ISBN 978-0-444-51608-4.
- Murphy, Cian C (2020). "The Crypto-Wars myth: The reality of state access to encrypted communications". Common Law World Review. 49 (3–4). SAGE Publications: 245–261. doi:10.1177/1473779520980556. hdl:1983/3c40a9b4-4a96-4073-b204-2030170b2e63. ISSN 1473-7795.
- Riebe, Thea; Kühn, Philipp; Imperatori, Philipp; Reuter, Christian (2022-02-26). "U.S. Security Policy: The Dual-Use Regulation of Cryptography and its Effects on Surveillance" (PDF). European Journal for Security Research. 7 (1). Springer Science and Business Media LLC: 39–65. doi:10.1007/s41125-022-00080-0. ISSN 2365-0931.
- Feigenbaum, Joan (2019-04-24). "Encryption and surveillance". Communications of the ACM. 62 (5). Association for Computing Machinery (ACM): 27–29. doi:10.1145/3319079. ISSN 0001-0782.
- Schneier, Bruce (1998). "Security pitfalls in cryptography" (PDF).

== See also ==
- 40-bit encryption
- Cipher security summary
- Export of cryptography
- Comparison of cryptography libraries
- FBI–Apple encryption dispute
- Hash function security summary
- Security level
