= MAGENTA =

Block cipher

General
- Designers: Michael Jacobson Jr., Klaus Huber
- First published: 1998

Cipher detail
- Key sizes: 128, 192 or 256 bits
- Block sizes: 128 bits
- Structure: Feistel network
- Rounds: 6 or 8

In cryptography, MAGENTA is a symmetric key block cipher developed by Michael Jacobson Jr. and Klaus Huber for Deutsche Telekom. The name MAGENTA is an acronym for Multifunctional Algorithm for General-purpose Encryption and Network Telecommunication Applications. (The color magenta is also part of the corporate identity of Deutsche Telekom.) The cipher was submitted to the Advanced Encryption Standard process, but did not advance beyond the first round; cryptographic weaknesses were discovered and it was found to be one of the slower ciphers submitted.

MAGENTA has a block size of 128 bits and key sizes of 128, 192 and 256 bits. It is a Feistel cipher with six or eight rounds.

After the presentation of the cipher at the first AES conference, several cryptographers immediately found vulnerabilities. These were written up and presented at the second AES conference (Biham et al., 1999).
