= Nimbus (cipher) =

Block cipher

General
- Designers: Alexis Machado
- First published: 2000

Cipher detail
- Key sizes: 128 bits
- Block sizes: 64 bits
- Rounds: 5

Best public cryptanalysis
- Differential cryptanalysis can break Nimbus with 256 chosen plaintexts.

In cryptography, Nimbus is a block cipher invented by Alexis Machado in 2000. It was submitted to the NESSIE project, but was not selected.

The algorithm uses a 128-bit key. It operates on blocks of 64 bits and consists of 5 rounds of encryption. The round function is exceedingly simple. In each round the block is XORed with a subkey, the order of its bits is reversed, and then it is multiplied mod 2^{64} by another subkey, which is forced to be odd.

Nimbus was broken by Vladimir Furman; he found a differential attack using only 256 chosen plaintexts.
