= Zodiac (cipher) =

Block cipher designed in 2000 by Chang-Hyi Lee

General
- Designers: Chang-Hyi Lee
- First published: 2000
- Derived from: SAFER, SHARK
- Related to: Xenon

Cipher detail
- Key sizes: 128, 192, or 256 bits
- Block sizes: 128 bits
- Structure: Feistel network
- Rounds: 16

Best public cryptanalysis
- Impossible differential cryptanalysis recovers 128-bit key in 2^{119} encryptions

In cryptography, Zodiac is a block cipher designed in 2000 by Chang-Hyi Lee for the Korean firm SoftForum.

Zodiac uses a 16-round Feistel network structure with key whitening. The round function uses only XORs and S-box lookups. There are two 8×8-bit S-boxes: one based on the discrete exponentiation 45^{x} as in SAFER, the other using the multiplicative inverse in the finite field GF(2^{8}), as introduced by SHARK.

Zodiac is theoretically vulnerable to impossible differential cryptanalysis, which can recover a 128-bit key in 2^{119} encryptions.
