= Nothing-up-my-sleeve number =

Cryptography number with no hidden properties

In cryptography, nothing-up-my-sleeve numbers are any numbers which, by their construction, are above suspicion of hidden properties. They are used in creating cryptographic functions such as hashes and ciphers. These algorithms often need randomized constants for mixing or initialization purposes. The cryptographer may wish to pick these values in a way which demonstrates the constants were not selected for a nefarious purpose, for example, to create a backdoor to the algorithm. These fears can be allayed by using numbers created in a way which leaves little room for adjustment. An example would be the use of initial digits from the number π as the constants. Using digits of π millions of places after the decimal point would not be considered trustworthy because the algorithm designer might have selected that starting point because it created a secret weakness the designer could later exploit—though even with natural-seeming selections, enough entropy exists in the possible choices that the utility of these numbers has been questioned.

Digits in the positional representations of real numbers such as π, e, and irrational roots are believed to appear with equal frequency (see normal number). Such numbers can be viewed as the opposite extreme of Chaitin–Kolmogorov random numbers in that they appear random but have very low information entropy.

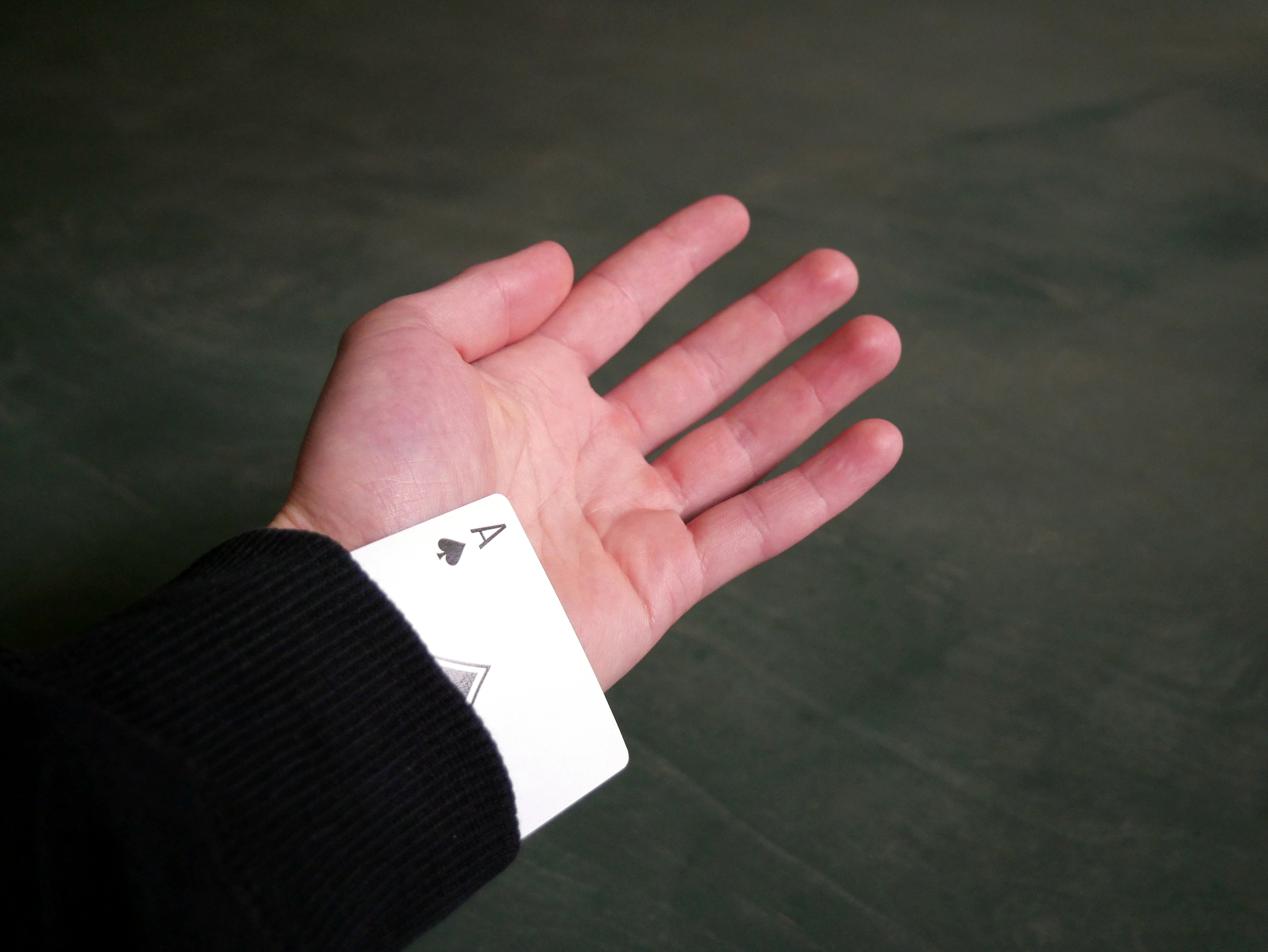
Card that was hidden in a sleeve

Their use is motivated by early controversy over the U.S. Government's 1975 Data Encryption Standard, which came under criticism because no explanation was supplied for the constants used in its S-box (though they were later found to have been carefully selected to protect against the then-classified technique of differential cryptanalysis). Thus a need was felt for a more transparent way to generate constants used in cryptography.

"Nothing up my sleeve" is a phrase associated with magicians, who sometimes preface a magic trick by holding open their sleeves to show they have no objects hidden inside.

== Examples ==
- Ron Rivest used pi to generate the S-box of the MD2 hash.
- Ron Rivest used the trigonometric sine function to generate constants for the widely used MD5 hash.
- The U.S. National Security Agency used the square roots of the first eight prime integers to produce the hash constants in their "Secure Hash Algorithm" functions, SHA-1 and SHA-2. SHA-1 also uses 0123456789ABCDEFFEDCBA9876543210F0E1D2C3 as its initial hash value.
- The Blowfish encryption algorithm uses the binary representation of π − 3 to initialize its key schedule.
- RFC 3526 describes prime numbers for internet key exchange which are also generated from π.
- The S-box of the NewDES cipher is derived from the United States Declaration of Independence.
- The AES candidate DFC derives all of its arbitrary constants, including all entries of the S-box, from the binary expansion of e.
- The ARIA key schedule uses the binary expansion of 1/π.
- The key schedule of the RC2 cipher uses a 256-entry "pi table" permutation, generated by a Fisher-Yates shuffle whose random positions are selected using consecutive 3-digit groups from the decimal expansion of π.
- The key schedule of the RC5 cipher uses binary digits from both e and the golden ratio.
- Multiple ciphers including TEA and Red Pike use 2654435769 or 0x9e3779b9 which is floor(2^{32}/φ), where φ is the golden ratio.
- The BLAKE hash function, a finalist in the SHA-3 competition, uses a table of 16 constant words which are the leading 512 or 1024 bits of the fractional part of π.
- The key schedule of the KASUMI cipher uses 0x123456789ABCDEFFEDCBA9876543210 to derive the modified key.
- The Salsa20 family of ciphers use the ASCII string "expand 32-byte k" or "expand 16-byte k" as constants in its block initialization process.
- OpenBSD Bcrypt uses the string "OrpheanBeholderScryDoubt" as an initialization string

== Counterexamples ==
- The Streebog hash function S-box was claimed to be generated randomly, but was reverse-engineered and proven to be generated algorithmically with some "puzzling" weaknesses.
- The Data Encryption Standard (DES) has constants which were given out by NSA. They turned out to be far from random, but instead made the algorithm resilient against differential cryptanalysis, a method not publicly known at the time.
- Dual_EC_DRBG, a NIST-recommended cryptographic pseudo-random bit generator, came under criticism in 2007 because constants recommended for use in the algorithm could have been selected in a way which would permit their author to predict future outputs given a sample of past generated values. In September 2013 The New York Times wrote "internal memos leaked by a former NSA contractor, Edward Snowden, suggest that the NSA generated one of the random number generators used in a 2006 NIST standard—called the Dual EC DRBG standard—which contains a back door for the NSA."
- ANSSI FRP256v1 uses totally unexplained parameters.

=== Manipulatable, but not trivially ===
ANSI X9.62 claims to use a so-called "verifiably at random" selection of elliptic curves. This is in fact just the result of applying a cryptographic hash function to any piece of data, and is pseudo-random at best. Its claimed resistance to manipulation lies solely in the resistance of the chosen hash function to a preimage attack, i.e. the relative difficulty in producing a piece of data which hashes to a given value. Still, the set of possible choices remains unrestricted; it is conceivable that an adversary could try many randomly-generated values until they find one with an exploitable property. Indeed, although the IEEE P1363 and NIST 186 standards had inherited these curves, they tone down the claims associated with the generation procedure.

The most commonly used parameters of this class are the NIST P-curves for elliptic curve cryptography. The coefficients in these curves are generated by applying SHA-1 to what was thought to be unexplained random seeds, such as:

- P-224: bd713447 99d5c7fc dc45b59f a3b9ab8f 6a948bc5.
- P-256: c49d3608 86e70493 6a6678e1 139d26b7 819f7e90.
- P-384: a335926a a319a27a 1d00896a 6773a482 7acdac73.

That said, this above method does improve upon just providing a value and claiming that it is "repeatedly randomly generated" until a certain property (e.g. the number of points on a curve) is met, which is the unverifiable explanation provided for the NSA-provided elliptic curves that X9.62 set out to replace using this method. These kinds of explanations make for "trivially manipulatable" curves.

In October 2026, cryptographers using Claude found that the seeds were generated from calls to the lrand48() pseudorandom number generator seeded with the unix timestamp. 20 byte seeds were drawn from randomness calls until one of them produced a conforming curve. Specifically, the used timestamps and retry counts were:

Curve	Timestamp	Retry count
P-224	891607927 (1998-04-03 12:52:07)	7026
P-256	871696354 (1997-08-16 01:52:34)	1842
P-384	872952608 (1997-08-30 14:50:08)	2688

The exposé of Dual_EC_DRBG ignited renewed interest in analyzing the explanations provided with the elliptic curve parameters. In this context, the explanation provided for the P-curves was considered inadequate: even beyond the not-quite-random issue above, its choice of other parameters "for efficiency reasons" were shown to be sub-optimal given newer research, although still mostly in line with what is publicly known about efficiently implementing ECC at the time. There remains no proof regarding the presence or absence of a backdoor in the P-curves, but the incomplete explanations do raise concern. In practice, many protocols have since allowed replacing P-256 with Curve25519, a newer curve with better-explained parameters and in a form that is easy to implement in a fast and correct way. SafeCurves, by Bernstein, provide an analysis on several relatively popular curves (of the time) and identify which ones share the "good" features of Curve25519.

== Limitations ==
Bernstein and coauthors demonstrate that use of nothing-up-my-sleeve numbers as the starting point in a complex procedure for generating cryptographic objects, such as elliptic curves, may not be sufficient to prevent insertion of back doors. For example, many candidates of seemingly harmless and "uninteresting" simple mathematical constants exist, such as π, e, Euler gamma, √2, √3, √5, √7, log(2), (1 + √5)/2, ζ(3), ζ(5), sin(1), sin(2), cos(1), cos(2), tan(1), or tan(2). For each of these constants, there also exist several different binary representations to choose from. If a constant is used as a random seed, a large number of hash function candidates also exist for selection, such as SHA-1, SHA-256, SHA-384, SHA-512, SHA-512/256, SHA3-256, or SHA3-384.

If there are enough adjustable parameters in the object selection procedure, combinatorial explosion ensures that the universe of possible choices and of apparently simple constants can be large enough so that an automatic search of the possibilities allows construction of an object with desired backdoor properties.
