= Stefan Lucks =

German cryptographer (born 1964)

- Born: 10 May 1965 (age 61)
- Education: University of Göttingen
- Known for: attacks on Triple DES, AES, LEVIATHAN, and E0
- Scientific career
- Fields: Computer science
- Workplaces: Bauhaus University, Weimar
- Thesis: Systematische Entwurfsmethoden für praktikable Kryptosysteme (1997)
- Doctoral advisor: Stephan Waack
- Website: www.uni-weimar.de

Stefan Lucks is a researcher in the fields of communications security and cryptography. Lucks is known for his attack on Triple DES, and for extending Lars Knudsen's Square attack to Twofish, a cipher outside the Square family, thus generalising the attack into integral cryptanalysis. He has also co-authored attacks on AES, LEVIATHAN, and the E0 cipher used in Bluetooth devices, as well as publishing strong password-based key agreement schemes.

Lucks graduated from the University of Dortmund in 1992, and received his PhD at the University of Göttingen in 1997. After leaving the University of Mannheim Lucks now heads the Chair of Information Security and Cryptography at Bauhaus University, Weimar.

Together with Niels Ferguson, Bruce Schneier and others he developed the Skein hash function as a candidate for the NIST hash function competition.
