= XSL (disambiguation) =

The three-letter abbreviation XSL may have multiple meanings, as described below:

- In computing, the Extensible Stylesheet Language: a set of language technologies for defining XML document transformation and presentation
- XSL Formatting Objects
- The XSL attack (eXtended Sparse Linearisation attack), a method for breaking ciphers
- The Xtreme Soccer League, a professional indoor soccer league
