= Eli Biham =

Israeli cryptographer and cryptanalyst (born 1960)

- אלי ביהם
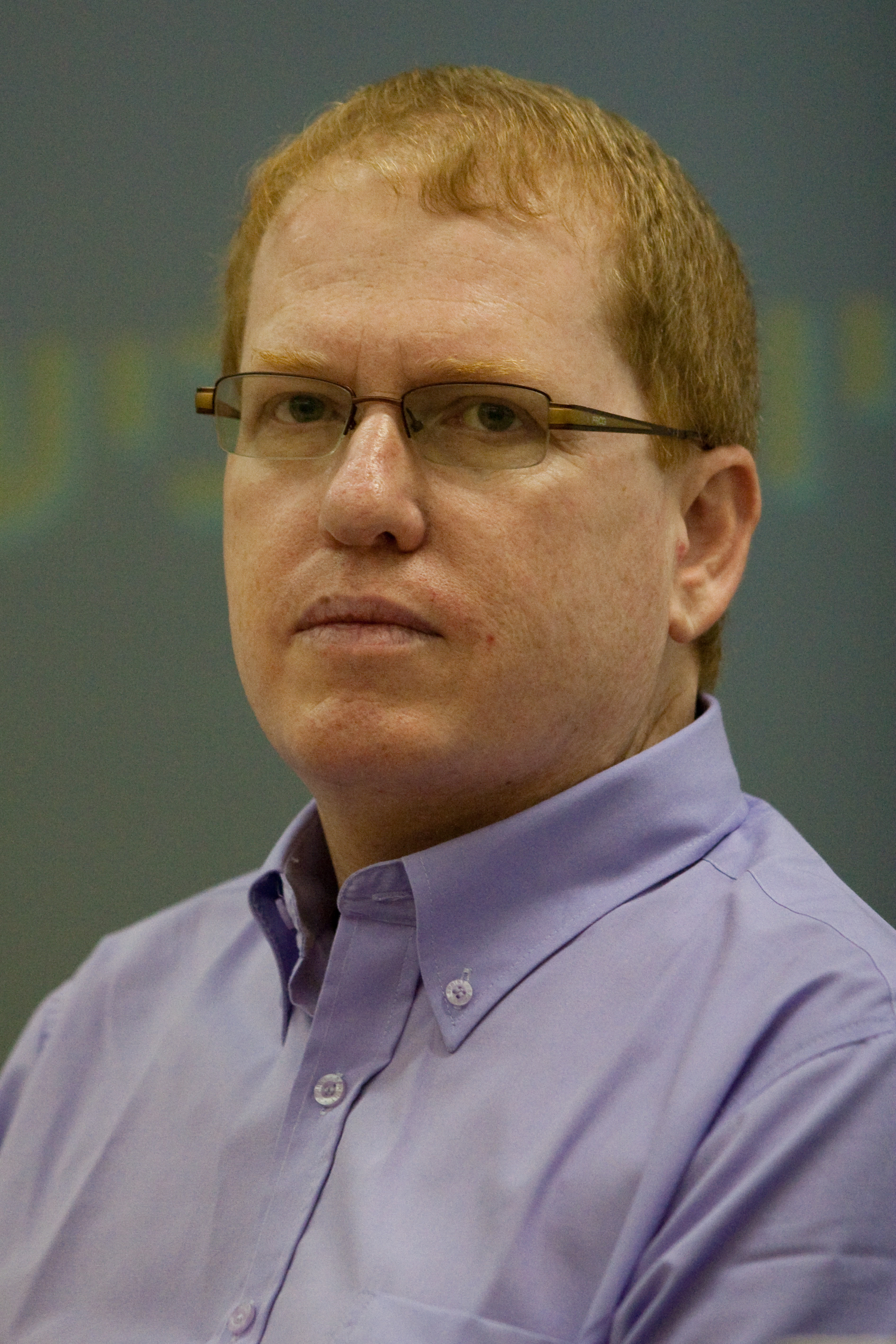
- Eli Biham in 2009.
- Born: 1960 (age 65–66)
- Education: Tel Aviv University, Weizmann Institute
- Known for: Studies in cryptography and cryptanalysis (invention and breaking of Encryption functions), specifically Differential cryptanalysis
- Scientific career
- Fields: Computer science
- Workplaces: Technion – Israel Institute of Technology
- Doctoral advisor: Adi Shamir

Eli Biham (Hebrew: אלי ביהם) is an Israeli cryptographer and cryptanalyst who is a professor at the Technion - Israel Institute of Technology Computer Science department. From 2008 to 2013, Biham was the dean of the Technion Computer Science department, after serving for two years as chief of CS graduate school. Biham invented (publicly) differential cryptanalysis, for which he received his Ph.D., while working under Adi Shamir.

== Contributions to cryptanalysis ==
- Differential cryptanalysis - publicly invented during his Ph.D. studies under Adi Shamir
- Attacking all triple modes of operation.
- Impossible differential cryptanalysis - joint work with Adi Shamir and Alex Biryukov
- Breaking (together with Lars Knudsen) the ANSI X9.52 CBCM mode (few days before the final standardization)
- Breaking the GSM security mechanisms (with Elad Barkan and Nathan Keller)
- Co-invention of related-key attacks.
- Differential Fault Analysis - joint work with Adi Shamir
- Conditional Linear Cryptanalysis - joint work with Stav Perle
- Efficient slide attacks with reduced time complexity

=== New cryptographic primitives ===
Biham has taken part in the design of several new cryptographic primitives:

- Serpent (with Ross Anderson and Lars Knudsen), a block cipher which was one of the final five contenders to become the Advanced Encryption Standard
- Tiger (with Ross Anderson), a hash function fast on 64-bit machines, and
- Py (with Jennifer Seberry), one of a family of fast stream ciphers (see article for more detail on their cryptanalytic status).
- SHAvite-3 (with Orr Dunkelman), a hash function which was one of the 14 semifinalists in the NIST hash function competition.
