= E2 (cipher) =

Block cipher

General
- Designers: NTT
- First published: 1998
- Successors: Camellia

Cipher detail
- Key sizes: 128, 192, or 256 bits
- Block sizes: 128 bits
- Structure: Feistel network
- Rounds: 12

In cryptography, E2 is a symmetric block cipher which was created in 1998 by NTT and submitted to the AES competition.

Like other AES candidates, E2 operates on blocks of 128 bits, using a key of 128, 192, or 256 bits. It uses a 12-round Feistel network. E2 has an input transformation and output transformation that both use modular multiplication, but the round function itself consists only of XORs and S-box lookups. The single 8×8-bit S-box is constructed from the composition of an affine transformation with the discrete exponentiation x^{127} over the finite field GF(2^{8}). NTT adopted many of E2's special characteristics in Camellia, which has essentially replaced E2.
