= Pseudo-Hadamard transform =

The pseudo-Hadamard transform is a reversible transformation of a bit string that provides cryptographic diffusion. See Hadamard transform.

The bit string must be of even length so that it can be split into two bit strings a and b of equal lengths, each of n bits. To compute the transform for Twofish algorithm, a' and b', from these we use the equations:

$$a' = a + b \, \pmod{2^n}$$

$$b' = a + 2b\, \pmod{2^n}$$

To reverse this, clearly:

$$b = b' - a' \, \pmod{2^n}$$

$$a = 2a' - b' \, \pmod{2^n}$$

On the other hand, the transformation for SAFER+ encryption is as follows:

$$a' = 2a + b \, \pmod{2^n}$$

$$b' = a + b\, \pmod{2^n}$$

== Generalization ==
The above equations can be expressed in matrix algebra, by considering a and b as two elements of a vector, and the transform itself as multiplication by a matrix of the form:

$$H_1 = \begin{bmatrix} 2 & 1 \\ 1 & 1 \end{bmatrix}$$

The inverse can then be derived by inverting the matrix.

However, the matrix can be generalised to higher dimensions, allowing vectors of any power-of-two size to be transformed, using the following recursive rule:

$$H_n = \begin{bmatrix} 2 \times H_{n-1} & H_{n-1} \\ H_{n-1} & H_{n-1} \end{bmatrix}$$

For example:

$$H_2 = \begin{bmatrix} 4 & 2 & 2 & 1 \\  2 & 2 & 1 & 1 \\ 2 & 1 & 2 & 1 \\ 1 & 1 & 1 & 1 \end{bmatrix}$$

== See also ==
- SAFER
- Twofish

This is the Kronecker product of an Arnold Cat Map matrix with a Hadamard matrix.
