= Square (cipher) =

Block cipher invented by Joan Daemen and Vincent Rijmen

General
- Designers: Joan Daemen, Vincent Rijmen
- First published: 1997
- Successors: AES, CRYPTON, Twofish, Serpent

Cipher detail
- Key sizes: 128 bits
- Block sizes: 128 bits
- Structure: substitution–permutation network
- Rounds: 8

In cryptography, Square (sometimes written SQUARE) is a block cipher invented by Joan Daemen and Vincent Rijmen. The design, published in 1997, is a forerunner to Rijndael, which has been adopted as the Advanced Encryption Standard. Square was introduced together with a new form of cryptanalysis discovered by Lars Knudsen, called the "Square attack".

The structure of Square is a substitution–permutation network with eight rounds, operating on 128-bit blocks and using a 128-bit key.

Square is not patented.
