= John Kelsey (cryptanalyst) =

Cryptographer

John Kelsey is a cryptographer who works at NIST. His research interests include cryptanalysis and design of symmetric cryptography primitives (block ciphers, stream ciphers, cryptographic hash functions, MACs), analysis and design of cryptographic protocols, cryptographic random number generation, electronic voting, side-channel attacks on cryptography implementations, and anonymizing communications systems. He previously worked at Certicom and Counterpane Internet Security.

== See also ==
- Yarrow algorithm, a family of cryptographic pseudorandom number generators
- Twofish, a symmetric key block cipher
