= CRYPTON =

Block cipher

General
- Designers: Chae Hoon Lim
- First published: 1998
- Derived from: Square

Cipher detail
- Key sizes: 128, 192, or 256 bits
- Block sizes: 128 bits
- Structure: Substitution–permutation network
- Rounds: 12

In cryptography, CRYPTON is a symmetric block cipher submitted as a candidate for the Advanced Encryption Standard (AES). It is very efficient in hardware implementations and was designed by Chae Hoon Lim of Future Systems Inc.

The CRYPTON algorithm processes blocks of 128 bits in the form of 4×4 byte arrays. The round transformation consists of four steps: byte-wise substitution, column-wise bit permutation, column-to-row transposition and finally key addition. CRYPTON uses 12 rounds of this encryption process. Due to the algorithm's nature, the decryption process can be made identical to the encryption process using a different key.

== See also ==
- AES process
