= Lars Knudsen (cryptographer) =

Danish cryptologist, computer scientist (born 1962)

Lars R. Knudsen
- Born: 21 February 1962 (age 64)
- Education: Aarhus University
- Scientific career
- Fields: Cryptography
- Workplaces: Technical University of Denmark
- Doctoral advisor: Ivan Damgård

Lars Ramkilde Knudsen (born 21 February 1962) is a Danish professor in cryptography.

== Academic ==
Knudsen enrolled at Aarhus University in 1984 studying mathematics and computer science, gaining an MSc in 1992 and a PhD in 1994. In 1999 he became a professor at the University of Bergen, Norway and in 2001 he became a professor at the Technical University of Denmark (DTU). Ivan Damgård was Lars' mentor during his studies at Aarhus University.

== Publications ==
Knudsen has published papers on cryptanalysis of cryptographic primitives, including the R-MAC scheme, the SHA-1 and MD2 hash functions, and some block ciphers: DES, DFC, IDEA, ICE, LOKI, MISTY, RC2, RC5, RC6, SC2000, Skipjack, Square and SAFER.

Knudsen was involved in designing ciphers: Serpent and the lightweight cipher PRESENT included in ISO/IEC 29192-2:2019. He was involved in designing Grøstl, a hash function which was one of the submissions to the NIST SHA-3 competition (it was not the winner).

He introduced the technique of impossible differential cryptanalysis and integral cryptanalysis.

== Industry ==
Knudsen is a co-founder of the communications companies Dencrypt A/S and PiiGuard ApS. Knudsen has been an editor for journals such as IEEE Transactions on Information Forensics and Security and Design, Codes and Cryptography. He has also chaired a number of international cryptography conferences, including FSE 1999, Eurocrypt 2002 and SAC 2012.

== Awards and recognitions ==
In August 2021, Knudsen was knighted as Ridder af Dannebrog. He has been a Fellow of the International Association of Cryptologic Research (IACR) since 2013 and a member of the Danish Academy of Technical Sciences (ATV) since 2005.
