= Secure and Fast Encryption Routine =

Family of block ciphers

In cryptography, SAFER (Secure and Fast Encryption Routine) is the name of a family of block ciphers designed primarily by James Massey (one of the designers of IDEA) on behalf of Cylink Corporation. Its first variant was published in 1993, and other variants were published until about 2000. The early SAFER K and SAFER SK designs share the same encryption function, but differ in the number of rounds and the key schedule. More recent versions – SAFER+ and SAFER++ – were submitted as candidates to the AES process in 1998 and the NESSIE project in 2000, respectively. All of the algorithms in the SAFER family are unpatented and available for unrestricted use.

== SAFER K and SAFER SK ==
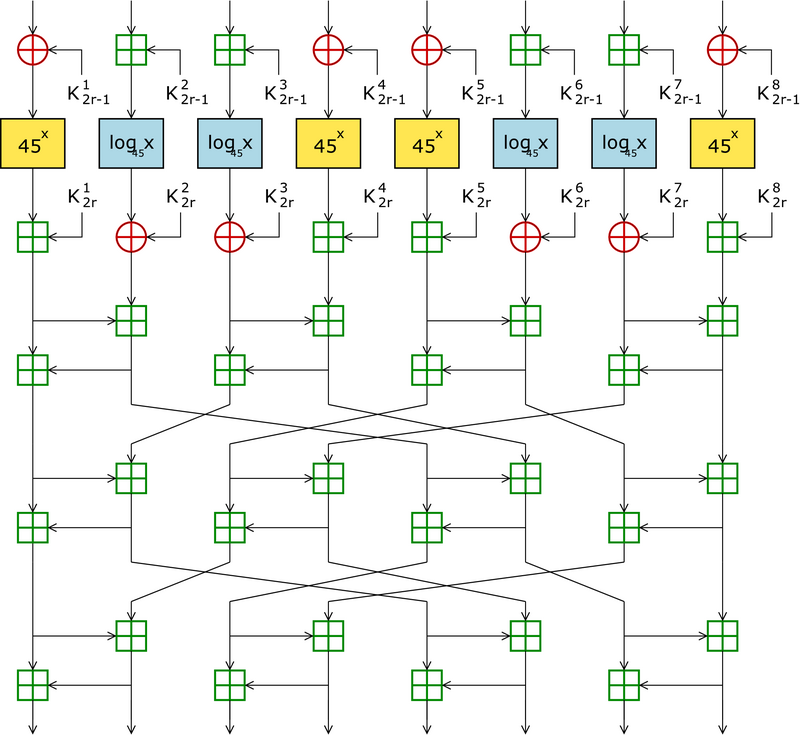
The SAFER K and SAFER SK round function.

The first SAFER cipher was SAFER K-64, published by Massey in 1993, with a 64-bit block size. The "K-64" denotes a key size of 64 bits. There was some demand for a version with a larger 128-bit key, and the following year Massey published such a variant incorporating new key schedule designed by the Singapore Ministry for Home affairs: SAFER K-128. However, both Lars Knudsen and Sean Murphy found minor weaknesses in this version, prompting a redesign of the key schedule to one suggested by Knudsen; these variants were named SAFER SK-64 and SAFER SK-128 respectively – the "SK" standing for "Strengthened Key schedule", though the RSA FAQ reports that, "one joke has it that SK really stands for 'Stop Knudsen', a wise precaution in the design of any block cipher". Another variant with a reduced key size was published, SAFER SK-40, to comply with 40-bit export restrictions.

All of these ciphers use the same round function consisting of four stages, as shown in the diagram: a key-mixing stage, a substitution layer, another key-mixing stage, and finally a diffusion layer. In the first key-mixing stage, the plaintext block is divided into eight 8-bit segments, and subkeys are added using either addition modulo 256 (denoted by a "+" in a square) or XOR (denoted by a "+" in a circle). The substitution layer consists of two S-boxes, each the inverse of each other, derived from discrete exponentiation (45^{x}) and logarithm (log_{45}x) functions. After a second key-mixing stage there is the diffusion layer: a novel cryptographic component termed a pseudo-Hadamard transform (PHT). (The PHT was also later used in the Twofish cipher.)

== SAFER+ and SAFER++ ==
There are two more-recent members of the SAFER family that have made changes to the main encryption routine, designed by the Armenian cryptographers Gurgen Khachatrian (American University of Armenia) and Melsik Kuregian in conjunction with Massey.

- SAFER+ (Massey et al., 1998) was submitted as a candidate for the Advanced Encryption Standard and has a block size of 128 bits. The cipher was not selected as a finalist. Bluetooth uses custom algorithms based on SAFER+ for key derivation (called E21 and E22) and authentication as message authentication codes (called E1). Encryption in Bluetooth does not use SAFER+.
- SAFER++ (Massey et al., 2000) was submitted to the NESSIE project in two versions, one with 64 bits, and the other with 128 bits.

== See also ==
- Substitution–permutation network
- Confusion and diffusion
