= Block size (cryptography) =

Length of bit string processed by a cipher

In modern cryptography, symmetric key ciphers are generally divided into stream ciphers and block ciphers. Block ciphers operate on a fixed length string of bits. The length of this bit string is the block size. Both the input (plaintext) and output (ciphertext) are the same length; the output cannot be shorter than the input – this follows logically from the pigeonhole principle and the fact that the cipher must be reversible – and it is undesirable for the output to be longer than the input.

Until the announcement of NIST's AES contest, the majority of block ciphers followed the example of the DES in using a block size of 64 bits (8 bytes). However, the birthday paradox indicates that after accumulating several blocks equal to the square root of the total number possible, there will be an approximately 50% chance of two or more being the same, which would start to leak information about the message contents. Thus even when used with a proper encryption mode (e.g. CBC or OFB), only 2^{32} × 8 B = 32 GB of data can be safely sent under one key. In practice a greater margin of security is desired, restricting a single key to the encryption of much less data — say a few hundred megabytes. At one point that seemed like a fair amount of data, but today it is easily exceeded. If the cipher mode does not properly randomise the input, the limit is even lower.

Consequently, AES candidates were required to support a block length of 128 bits (16 bytes). This should be acceptable for up to 2^{64} × 16 B = 256 exabytes of data, and would suffice for many years after introduction. The winner of the AES contest, Rijndael, supports block and key sizes of 128, 192, and 256 bits, but in AES the block size is always 128 bits. The extra block sizes were not adopted by the AES standard.

Many block ciphers, such as RC5, support a variable block size. The Luby-Rackoff construction and the Outerbridge construction can both increase the effective block size of a cipher.

Joan Daemen's 3-Way and BaseKing have unusual block sizes of 96 and 192 bits, respectively.

== See also ==
- Ciphertext stealing
- Format-preserving encryption
