= MMB (cipher) =

Block cipher

General
- Designers: Joan Daemen
- First published: 1993
- Derived from: IDEA
- Successors: ABC

Cipher detail
- Key sizes: 128 bits
- Block sizes: 128 bits
- Structure: Substitution–permutation network
- Rounds: 6

Best public cryptanalysis
- Key recovery using 2^{67} chosen plaintexts

In cryptography, MMB (Modular Multiplication-based Block cipher) is a block cipher designed by Joan Daemen as an improved replacement for the IDEA cipher. Modular multiplication is the central element in the design. Weaknesses in the key schedule were identified by Eli Biham, and this, together with the cipher's not having been designed to resist linear cryptanalysis, meant that other designs were pursued instead, such as 3-Way.

MMB has a key size and block size of 128 bits.
