= Lawrie Brown =

Cryptographer

Lawrence Peter Brown
- Other name: Lawrie Brown
- Education: University of New South Wales (Ph.D.)
- Known for: Design of the block ciphers LOKI and the AES candidate LOKI97
- Scientific career
- Fields: cryptography, computer security
- Thesis: Analysis of the DES and the Design of the LOKI Encryption Scheme (1991)
- Doctoral advisor: Jennifer Seberry

Lawrence Peter "Lawrie" Brown is a cryptographer and computer security researcher, currently a (retired and now visiting) Senior Lecturer with UNSW Canberra at the Australian Defence Force Academy. His notable work includes the design of the block ciphers LOKI and the AES candidate LOKI97. He received his Ph.D. in mathematics from the University of New South Wales in 1991 under the supervision of Jennifer Seberry, with a dissertation on the design of LOKI and the cryptanalysis of the Data Encryption Standard. Subsequently, his research changed focus to the Safe Erlang mobile code system, to aspects of trust issues in eCommerce with some of his Ph.D. students, and with the use of Proxy Certificates for Client Authentication.

== Publications ==
- Computer Security: Principles and Practice, 3/e, Pearson Education, 2015

== Personal interests ==
According to his personal homepage, Brown's social activities include dancing a number of different styles. He has also composed some of his own dances. He enjoys reading science fiction and is an amateur radio enthusiast. Brown is a practicing Baptist.
