= MMB =

MMB may refer to:

== Music ==
- Michigan Marching Band, of the University of Michigan
- The Mighty Mighty Bosstones, a band from Boston

== Computing, science, and technology ==
- MMB (cipher), a block cipher in cryptography
- 3-Mercapto-3-methylbutan-1-ol, a chemical found in some wines
- Minimal metabolic behaviors, for modeling metabolic networks
- Middle mouse button, a button on the computer mouse

== Other uses ==
- Maharashtra Maritime Board
- Maritime Museum of Barcelona
- Memanbetsu Airport, an airport at Hokkaidō, Japan (IATA airport code: MMB)
- Milk Marketing Board, a former British government quango
