= Burt Kaliski =

- Born: Burt Kaliski
- Education: Massachusetts Institute of Technology (BS, MS, PhD)
- Occupation: Cryptographer

Burton S. "Burt" Kaliski, Jr. is a cryptographer, who is currently the chief technology officer (CTO) and senior vice president at Verisign. Before joining Verisign in 2011, he was the founding director of the EMC Innovation Network at EMC Corporation since its 2006 acquisition of RSA Security where he was Chief Scientist for RSA Laboratories. His notable work includes the development of such public key cryptography standards as PKCS and IEEE P1363, the extension of linear cryptanalysis to use multiple approximations, and the design of the block cipher Crab.

Kaliski received his B.S., M.S., and Ph.D. degrees in computer science from MIT, where his research was on cryptography. He was a visiting assistant professor of computer engineering at Rochester Institute of Technology before joining RSA Security.

He was also a guest professor and member of the international advisory board of Peking University, School of Software and Microelectronics.
