= CrypTool =

Software for illustrating cryptographic and cryptanalytic concepts

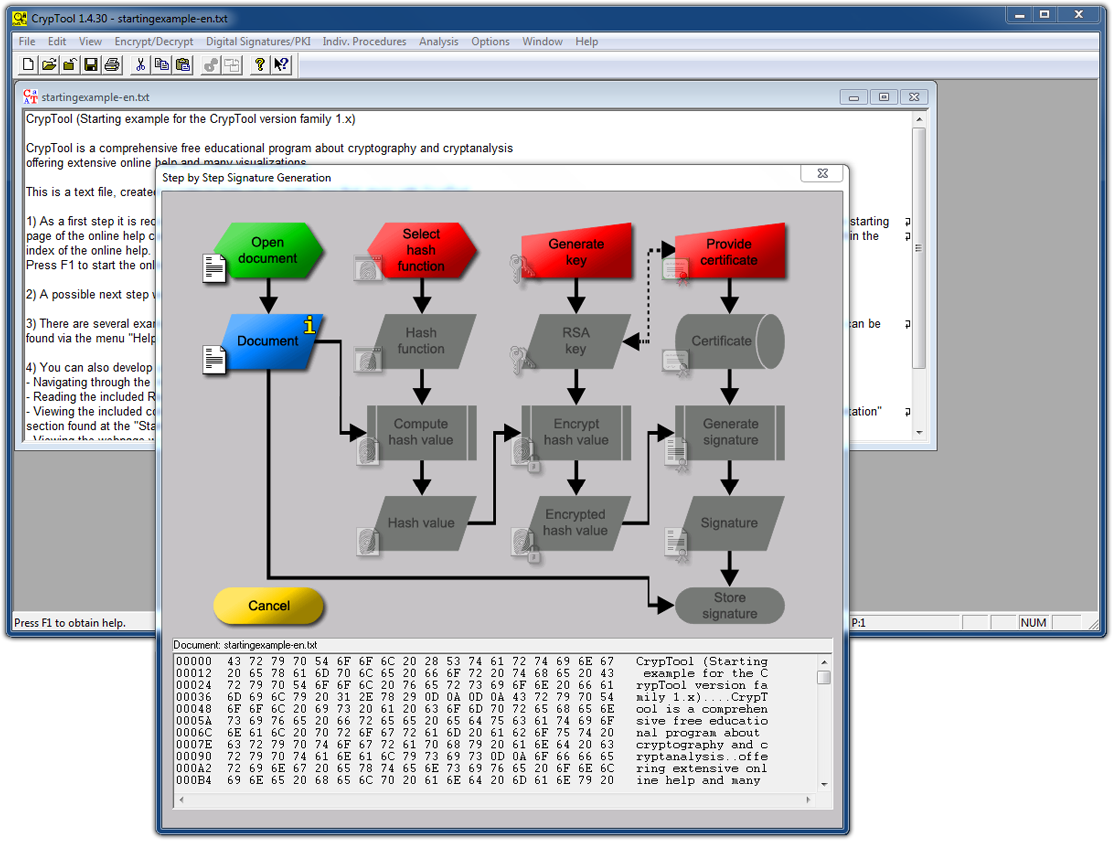
- E-Learning Program for Cryptography
- Developer: Bernhard Esslinger
- Initial release: 1998; 28 years ago
- Stable release: CT 1.4.42 (December 2021) CT 2.1 (release 2024.1) (January 2024); JCT 1.0.9 (September 2023)
- Operating system: CT1 and CT2: Microsoft Windows, JCT: Win, Linux and macOS
- Type: Cryptography, Encryption, Privacy, E-Learning
- License: Apache Licence 2.0
- Website: www.cryptool.org
- Repository: github.com/jcryptool/core

CrypTool is an open-source project that is a free e-learning software for illustrating cryptographic and cryptanalytic concepts.

== History ==
The development of CrypTool started in 1998. Originally developed by German companies and universities, it is an open-source project since 2001.

Currently 4 versions of CrypTool are maintained and developed: CrypTool 1 (CT1), CrypTool 2 (CT2), JCrypTool (JCT), and CrypTool-Online (CTO). All are available in English and German.

The goal of the CrypTool project is to make users aware of how cryptography can help against network security threats and to explain the underlying concepts of cryptology.

The development of CT1 started in 1998. It is written in C++ and designed for the Microsoft Windows operating system.

In 2007, development began on two additional projects, both based on a pure-plugin architecture, to serve as successors to the original CT1 program:

- CrypTool 2 (built with C#/.NET/WPF) (abbreviated CT2)

uses the concept of visual programming to clarify cryptographic processes. Currently, CT2 contains more than 150 crypto functions.

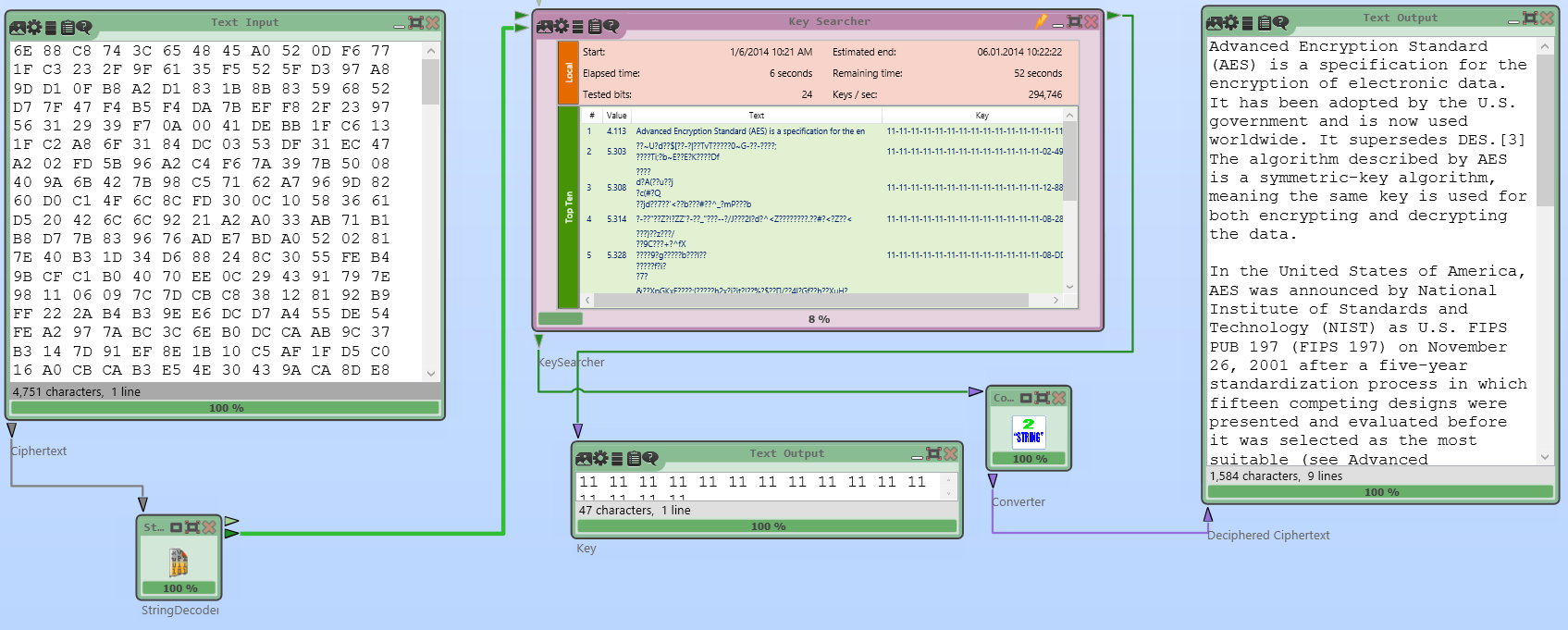

- JCrypTool 1.0 (built with Java/Eclipse/RCP/SWT) (abbreviated JCT)

runs on Windows, macOS, and Linux, and offers both a document-centric and a function-centric perspective. Currently, JCT contains more than 100 crypto functions. One of its focal points are modern digital signatures (like Merkle trees and SPHINCS).

The browser software CrypTool-Online (CTO) has been in development since 2010 and is now the one most widely used.

Since 2023, the project has been managed by the CODE research institute at the University of the Bundeswehr Munich.

CrypTool is used in schools, universities, companies and agencies for education and awareness training.

== See also ==
- Asymmetric key algorithm
- Topics in cryptography
- Cryptosystem
