= SOBER-128 =

Stream cipher

SOBER-128 is a synchronous stream cipher designed by Hawkes and Rose (2003) and is a member of the SOBER family of ciphers. SOBER-128 was also designed to provide MAC (message authentication code) functionality.

Watanabe and Furuya (2004) showed a weakness in the MAC generation of SOBER-128 which means an attack could forge a message with probability 2^{−6}. MAC functionality was deleted by Qualcomm from SOBER-128 reference code.

SOBER-128 takes a key up to 128 bits in length.

== See also ==
- Helix
- Turing
