= Gregory G. Rose =

American cryptographer (born 1955)

Gregory G. "Greg" Rose (born July 15, 1955, in Sydney, Australia) was a senior vice president of technology for Qualcomm.

Rose is noted for designing the SOBER family of stream ciphers for wireless telephony. Together with Philip Hawkes, he also designed Turing, a cipher system based on the SOBER-t32. It was developed to address encryption issues, particularly the limitations to processing power, program space, and memory present in software encryption algorithms.

== Selected publications ==
- "Exploiting Multiples of the Connection Polynomial in Word-Oriented Stream Ciphers"
