= NUSH =

Block cipher

General
- Designers: Anatoly Lebedev; Alexey Volchkov
- First published: 2000

Cipher detail
- Key sizes: 128, 192, or 256 bits
- Block sizes: 64, 128, or 256 bits
- Rounds: 9, 17, or 33

Best public cryptanalysis
- A linear attack faster than exhaustive search has been found.

In cryptography, NUSH is a block cipher invented by Anatoly Lebedev and Alexey Volchkov for the Russian company LAN Crypto. It was submitted to the NESSIE project, but was not selected.

NUSH exists in several different variants, using keys of 128, 192, or 256 bits, and a block size of 64, 128, or 256 bits. The number of rounds is 9, 17, or 33, depending on the block size. The algorithm uses key whitening, but no S-boxes; the only operations it uses are AND, OR, XOR, modular addition, and bit rotation.

It has been shown that linear cryptanalysis can break NUSH with less effort than a brute force attack.
