= KCipher-2 =

General
- Designers: KDDI Research; Kyushu University
- First published: 2007; 19 years ago
- Certification: CRYPTREC

Cipher detail
- Key sizes: 128 bits
- State size: 640 bits

KCipher-2 is a stream cipher jointly developed by Kyushu University and Japanese telecommunications company KDDI. It is standardized as ISO/IEC 18033–4, and is on the list of recommended ciphers published by the Japanese Cryptography Research and Evaluation Committees (CRYPTREC). It has a key length of 128 bits, and can encrypt and decrypt around seven to ten times faster than the Advanced Encryption Standard (AES) algorithm.
