= Chaotic cryptology =

Chaotic cryptology is the application of mathematical chaos theory to the practice of cryptography, the study or techniques used to privately and securely transmit information in the presence of a third-party or adversary. Since first being investigated by Robert Matthews in 1989, the use of chaos in cryptography has attracted much interest. However, long-standing concerns about its security and implementation speed continue to limit its implementation.

Chaotic cryptology consists of two opposite processes: Chaotic cryptography and Chaotic cryptanalysis. Cryptography refers to encrypting information for secure transmission, whereas cryptanalysis refers to decrypting and deciphering encoded encrypted messages.

In order to use chaos theory efficiently in cryptography, the chaotic maps are implemented such that the entropy generated by the map can produce required Confusion and diffusion. Properties in chaotic systems and cryptographic primitives share unique characteristics that allow for the chaotic systems to be applied to cryptography. If chaotic parameters, as well as cryptographic keys, can be mapped symmetrically or mapped to produce acceptable and functional outputs, it will make it next to impossible for an adversary to find the outputs without any knowledge of the initial values. Since chaotic maps in a real life scenario require a set of numbers that are limited, they may, in fact, have no real purpose in a cryptosystem if the chaotic behavior can be predicted.

One of the most important issues for any cryptographic primitive is the security of the system. However, in numerous cases, chaos-based cryptography algorithms are proved insecure. The main issue in many of the cryptanalyzed algorithms is the inadequacy of the chaotic maps implemented in the system.

== Types ==
Chaos-based cryptography has been divided into two major groups:

- Symmetric chaos cryptography, where the same secret key is used by sender and receiver.
- Asymmetric chaos cryptography, where one key of the cryptosystem is public. Some of the few proposed systems have been broken.

The majority of chaos-based cryptographic algorithms are symmetric. Many use discrete chaotic maps in their process.

== Applications ==
=== Image encryption ===
Bourbakis and Alexopoulos in 1991 proposed supposedly the earliest fully intended digital image encryption scheme which was based on SCAN language. Later on, with the emergence of chaos-based cryptography hundreds of new image encryption algorithms, all with the aim of improving the security of digital images were proposed. However, there were three main aspects of the design of an image encryption that was usually modified in different algorithms (chaotic map, application of the map and structure of algorithm). The initial and perhaps most crucial point was the chaotic map applied in the design of the algorithms. The speed of the cryptosystem is always an important parameter in the evaluation of the efficiency of a cryptography algorithm, therefore, the designers were initially interested in using simple chaotic maps such as tent map, and the logistic map. However, in 2006 and 2007, the new image encryption algorithms based on more sophisticated chaotic maps proved that application of chaotic map with higher dimension could improve the quality and security of the cryptosystems.

=== Hash function ===
Chaotic behavior can generate hash functions, such as applying the Chirikov/Julia 3D trajectory translation into a SHA-512 hash.

=== Random number generation ===
The unpredictable behavior of the chaotic maps can be used in the generation of random numbers. Some of the earliest chaos-based random number generators tried to directly generate random numbers from the logistic map. Many more recent works did so using the numerical solutions of hyperchaotic systems of differential equations, either at the integer-order, or the fractional-order.
