= Xuejia Lai =

Cryptographer

Xuejia Lai (simplified Chinese: 来学嘉; traditional Chinese: 來學嘉; pinyin: Lái Xuéjiā) is a cryptographer, currently a professor at Shanghai Jiao Tong University. His notable work includes the design of the block cipher IDEA based on the Lai-Massey scheme, the theory of Markov ciphers, and the cryptanalysis of a number of cryptographic hash functions. His book On the Design and Security of Block Ciphers (ISBN 978-3891915738) is frequently cited in cryptography papers.

Lai received a B.Sc. in electrical engineering in 1982 and an M.Sc. in mathematics in 1984 at Northwest Institute of Telecommunication Engineering. About 1982 he met James Massey, who was visiting the university to give lectures in cryptography. Lai served as interpreter for these lectures. He later became one of Massey's doctoral students at ETH Zurich, where he received his Ph.D. in 1992. Together they designed the IDEA cipher.
