= CLEFIA =

Block cipher

General
- Designers: Sony
- First published: 2007
- Certification: CRYPTREC (Candidate)

Cipher detail
- Key sizes: 128, 192, or 256 bits
- Block sizes: 128 bits
- Structure: Feistel network
- Rounds: 18, 22, or 26

Best public cryptanalysis
- An improbable differential attack requiring 2^{126.83} chosen plaintexts breaks 13 rounds with a complexity of 2^{126.83} encryptions for the key size of length 128 bits (Tezcan, 2010). Similar attacks apply for 14 and 15 rounds of CLEFIA for the key sizes 192 and 256 bits, respectively.

CLEFIA is a proprietary block cipher algorithm, developed by Sony. Its name is derived from the French word clef, meaning "key". The block size is 128-bits, and the key size can be 128-bit, 192-bit or 256-bits. It is intended to be used in DRM systems. It is among the cryptographic techniques recommended candidate for Japanese government use by CRYPTREC revision in 2013.

== Standardization ==
CLEFIA is included in the following standards.

- ISO/IEC 29192-2:2019, Information security - Lightweight cryptography - Part 2: Block ciphers
- RFC 6114
