= Q (cipher) =

Block cipher

General
- Designers: Leslie McBride
- First published: November 2000
- Derived from: AES, Serpent

Cipher detail
- Key sizes: 128, 192, or 256 bits
- Block sizes: 128 bits
- Structure: Substitution–permutation network
- Rounds: 8 or 9

Best public cryptanalysis
- A linear attack succeeds with 98.4% probability using 2^{97} known plaintexts.

In cryptography, Q is a block cipher invented by Leslie McBride. It was submitted to the NESSIE project, but was not selected.

The algorithm uses a key size of 128, 192, or 256 bits. It operates on blocks of 128 bits using a substitution–permutation network structure. There are 8 rounds for a 128-bit key and 9 rounds for a longer key. Q uses S-boxes adapted from Rijndael (also known as AES) and Serpent. It combines the nonlinear operations from these ciphers, but leaves out all the linear transformations except the permutation. Q also uses a constant derived from the golden ratio as a source of "nothing up my sleeve numbers".

Q is vulnerable to linear cryptanalysis; Keliher, Meijer, and Tavares have an attack that succeeds with 98.4% probability using 2^{97} known plaintexts.
