= Robert Matthews (scientist) =

British scientist

Robert Matthews FRAS CPhys
- Born: Robert A. J. Matthews; 23 September 1959 (age 66) Carshalton, United Kingdom
- Education: Corpus Christi College
- Occupations: Physicist and science writer

Robert A. J. Matthews (born 23 September 1959), is a British physicist and science writer.

After graduating in physics at Corpus Christi College, Oxford University, in 1981, Matthews took up a dual career in science writing and academic research. He is currently science consultant and columnist for the science magazine BBC Focus, a freelance columnist for The National in Abu Dhabi and visiting professor in the Department of Mathematics, Aston University. He is also a Fellow of the Royal Statistical Society, a Chartered Physicist and a Fellow of the Royal Astronomical Society.

== Science journalism ==
Matthews has held various specialist posts on national newspapers in the UK, including technology correspondent for The Times and science correspondent for The Sunday Telegraph. In addition, he has written on a freelance basis for, among others, New Scientist, The Economist, The Financial Times, Reader's Digest and The Spectator. His professional awards include Feature Writer of the Year in 2000, by the Association of British Science Writers.

== Academic research ==
Matthews has published research in refereed journals on a wide variety of subjects ranging from Bayesian inference and probability to astronomy, chaotic cryptology and neural computing. He has also won awards for his research, including an Ig Nobel Prize, awarded in 1996 for his paper Tumbling toast, Murphy's Law and the fundamental constants.

== Published works ==
Matthews is the author of several popular science books, 25 Big Ideas in Science (2005), Q&A: Cosmic Conundrums and Everyday Mysteries of Science (2005) and Unravelling the Mind of God: Mysteries at the Frontiers of Science (London: Virgin 1992).

In 2016, he published Chancing It: The laws of chance and what they can do for you (London: Profile Books).

== See also ==
- List of Ig Nobel Prize winners
