= Two-Track-MAC =

Message authentication code

Two-Track-MAC is a message authentication code submitted to the NESSIE project in 2000 by Bart Van Rompay (KU Leuven) and Bert den Boer (debis AG). It is based on a dual-track hashing structure derived from RIPEMD, in which two parallel computation paths are combined to produce the final MAC.

It uses a dual-track structure derived from RIPEMD, in which two parallel computation paths are combined. This is superficially similar to constructions such as MDC-2, which also employ parallel processing, though the underlying designs differ significantly.
