= Lagged Fibonacci generator =

Pseudorandom number generator

A Lagged Fibonacci generator (LFG or sometimes LFib) is an example of a pseudorandom number generator. This class of random number generator is aimed at being an improvement on the 'standard' linear congruential generator. These are based on a generalisation of the Fibonacci sequence.

The Fibonacci sequence may be described by the recurrence relation:

$$S_n = S_{n-1} + S_{n-2}$$

Hence, the new term is the sum of the last two terms in the sequence. This can be generalised to the sequence:

$$S_n \equiv S_{n-j} \star S_{n-k}  \pmod{m},   0 < j < k$$

In which case, the new term is some combination of any two previous terms. m is usually a power of 2 (m = 2^{M}), often 2^{32} or 2^{64}. The $\star$ operator denotes a general binary operation. This may be either addition, subtraction, multiplication, or the bitwise exclusive-or operator (XOR). The theory of this type of generator is rather complex, and it may not be sufficient simply to choose random values for j and k. These generators also tend to be very sensitive to initialisation.

Generators of this type employ k words of state (they 'remember' the last k values).

If the operation used is addition, then the generator is described as an Additive Lagged Fibonacci Generator or ALFG, if multiplication is used, it is a Multiplicative Lagged Fibonacci Generator or MLFG, and if the XOR operation is used, it is called a Two-tap generalised feedback shift register or GFSR. The Mersenne Twister algorithm is a variation on a GFSR. The GFSR is also related to the linear-feedback shift register, or LFSR.

== Properties of lagged Fibonacci generators ==
The maximum period of lagged Fibonacci generators depends on the binary operation $\star$. If addition or subtraction is used, the maximum period is (2^{k} − 1) × 2^{M−1}. If multiplication is used, the maximum period is (2^{k} − 1) × 2^{M−3}, or 1/4 of period of the additive case. If bitwise xor is used, the maximum period is 2^{k} − 1.

For the generator to achieve this maximum period, the polynomial:

y = x^{k} + x^{j} + 1

must be primitive over the integers mod 2. Values of j and k satisfying this constraint have been published in the literature.

Popular pairs of primitive polynomial degrees
j	7	5	24	65	128	6	31	97	353	168	334	273	418
k	10	17	55	71	159	31	63	127	521	521	607	607	1279

Another list of possible values for j and k is on page 29 of volume 2 of The Art of Computer Programming:

(24, 55), (38, 89), (37, 100), (30, 127), (83, 258), (107, 378), (273, 607), (1029, 2281), (576, 3217), (4187, 9689), (7083, 19937), (9739, 23209)

Note that the smaller number have short periods (only a few "random" numbers are generated before the first "random" number is repeated and the sequence restarts).

If addition is used, it is required that at least one of the first k values chosen to initialise the generator be odd. If multiplication is used, instead, it is required that all the first k values be odd, and further that at least one of them is ±3 mod 8.

It has been suggested that good ratios between j and k are approximately the golden ratio.

== Problems with LFGs ==
In a paper on four-tap shift registers, Robert M. Ziff, referring to LFGs that use the XOR operator, states that "It is now widely known that such generators, in particular with the two-tap rules such as R(103, 250), have serious deficiencies. Marsaglia observed very poor behavior with R(24, 55) and smaller generators, and advised against using generators of this type altogether. ... The basic problem of two-tap generators R(a, b) is that they have a built-in three-point correlation between $x_{n}$, $x_{n-a}$, and $x_{n-b}$, simply given by the generator itself ... While these correlations are spread over the size $p = max(a, b, c, \ldots )$ of the generator itself, they can evidently still lead to significant errors.". This only refers to the standard LFG where each new number in the sequence depends on two previous numbers. A three-tap LFG has been shown to eliminate some statistical problems such as failing the Birthday Spacings and Generalized Triple tests.

== Example implementation ==
A simple implementation in the C programming language may look as shown below. This implementation uses 64-bit words and has a period of (2^{607} -1) × 2^{63}

#define R (607)
#define S (273)

#include <stdint.h>

uint64_t  X[R];

uint64_t  gen_rand()
{
    static int j = S - 1, k = R - 1;
	uint64_t  r;
    
    r = X[k] = X[k] + X[j--];
	k--;
	if (j < 0)
		j = R - 1;
	else if (k < 0)
		k = R - 1;
	return r;
}

== Usage ==
- Freeciv uses a lagged Fibonacci generator with {j = 24, k = 55} for its random number generator.
- The Boost library includes an implementation of a lagged Fibonacci generator.
- Subtract with carry, a lagged Fibonacci generator engine, is included in the C++11 library.
- The Oracle Database implements this generator in its DBMS_RANDOM package (available in Oracle 8 and newer versions).

== See also ==
Wikipedia page 'List of random number generators' lists other PRNGs including some with better statistical qualities:

- Linear congruential generator
- ACORN generator
- Mersenne Twister
- Xoroshiro128+
- FISH (cipher)
- Pike
- VIC cipher
