= Josef Pieprzyk =

Polish cryptographer (born 1949)

Josef Pieprzyk (born 1949 in Poland) is currently a professor at Queensland University of Technology in Brisbane, Australia.

He has worked on cryptography, in particular the XSL attack. He collaborated in the invention of the LOKI and LOKI97 block ciphers and the HAVAL cryptographic hash function.
