= James Massey =

American information theorist, cryptographer, and scholar (1934 – 2013)

James Massey

James Lee Massey (February 11, 1934 – June 16, 2013) was an American information theorist and cryptographer, Professor Emeritus of Digital Technology at ETH Zurich. His notable work includes the application of the Berlekamp–Massey algorithm to linear codes, the design of the block ciphers IDEA (with Xuejia Lai, based on the Lai-Massey scheme) and SAFER, and the Massey-Omura cryptosystem (with Jim K. Omura).

== Biography ==
Massey was born in Wauseon, Ohio. As a child, after the death of his father in Ohio, he moved with his mother and brother to Mendota, Illinois. At age 14, his family moved to Ottawa, Illinois. After graduating from St. Bede Academy, he entered the University of Notre Dame. He received a B.S. in electrical engineering from Notre Dame in 1956 and was granted an NSF Fellowship. After three years of military service, he began graduate studies in 1959 at MIT, where he concentrated on coding theory and was awarded a Ph.D. in 1962, with John Wozencraft as his advisor. He returned to Notre Dame, where he taught electrical engineering until 1977, publishing significant research in convolutional codes, frame synchronization techniques and feedback-assisted communication. After a brief period at UCLA, Massey accepted a position at ETH Zurich in 1980. He remained there until his retirement in 1998.

Massey died of colon cancer on June 16, 2013 in Copenhagen, Denmark.

== Honors and awards ==
- IEEE Fellow, 1971
- Baker Prize, 1987
- Claude E. Shannon Award, 1988
- IEEE Alexander Graham Bell Medal, 1992
- Marconi Prize, 1999
- Member of the National Academy of Engineering
- Member of the Royal Swedish Academy of Sciences
- IACR Fellow, 2009

Awards
Preceded by C. Chapin Cutler, John O. Limb and Arun Netravali	IEEE Alexander Graham Bell Medal; 1992	Succeeded by Donald Cox
