= NOEKEON =

Family of block ciphers

Noekeon
General
- Designers: Joan Daemen, Michaël Peeters, Gilles Van Assche, Vincent Rijmen
- First published: 2000-09
- Derived from: 3-Way, BaseKing

Cipher detail
- Key sizes: 128 bits
- Block sizes: 128 bits
- Rounds: 16

NOEKEON /ˈnuːki.ɒn/ is a family of two block ciphers designed by Joan Daemen, Michaël Peeters, Gilles Van Assche and Vincent Rijmen and submitted to the NESSIE project in September 2000. The two ciphers are "direct mode" NOEKEON, to be used for maximum efficiency where related-key attacks are not possible, and "indirect mode" NOEKEON where they are.

NOEKEON has a 128-bit block and key size. Each round of NOEKEON employs a sequence of self-inverse transformations which can be implemented easily in hardware or software, even where differential power analysis is a concern. It is designed according to a variant of the wide-trail strategy.

Cryptanalysis by Lars Knudsen and Håvard Raddum in April 2001 showed that "indirect mode" NOEKEON was still vulnerable to certain peculiar kinds of related-key cryptanalysis, and showed weaknesses in NOEKEON-variant ciphers which cast doubt on the design strategy behind NOEKEON and thus on its security. As a result, it was not a NESSIE selected algorithm.

The authors of NOEKEON contend ("On NOEKEON, no!") that the related-key attacks required to break "indirect mode" NOEKEON are not a practical concern, and that it is as a result of deliberate design that NOEKEON is not vulnerable to the attacks that break the variant ciphers; they assert that NOEKEON is still a good and useful cipher.
