= Mitsuru Matsui =

Japanese cryptographer (born 1961)

Mitsuru Matsui (松井 充, Matsui Mitsuru; born September 16, 1961) is a Japanese cryptographer and senior researcher for Mitsubishi Electric Company.

== Career ==
While researching error-correcting codes in 1990, Matsui was inspired by Eli Biham and Adi Shamir's differential cryptanalysis, and discovered the technique of linear cryptanalysis, published in 1993. Differential and linear cryptanalysis are the two major general techniques known for the cryptanalysis of block ciphers.

The following year, Matsui was the first to publicly report an experimental cryptanalysis of DES, using the computing power of twelve workstations over a period of fifty days.

He is also the author of the MISTY-1 and MISTY-2 block ciphers, and contributed to the design of Camellia and KASUMI.

For his achievements, Matsui got the 2012 RSA Conference Award for Excellence in Mathematics.
