= Hierocrypt =

Family of block ciphers

Hierocrypt-L1
General
- Designers: Toshiba
- First published: 2000
- Related to: Hierocrypt-3
- Certification: CRYPTREC (Candidate)

Cipher detail
- Key sizes: 128 bits
- Block sizes: 64 bits
- Structure: Nested SPN
- Rounds: 6.5

Best public cryptanalysis

Hierocrypt-3
General
- Designers: Toshiba
- First published: 2000
- Related to: Hierocrypt-L1
- Certification: CRYPTREC (Candidate)

Cipher detail
- Key sizes: 128, 192, or 256 bits
- Block sizes: 128 bits
- Structure: Nested SPN
- Rounds: 6.5, 7.5, or 8.5

Best public cryptanalysis

In cryptography, Hierocrypt-L1 and Hierocrypt-3 are block ciphers created by Toshiba in 2000. They were submitted to the NESSIE project, but were not selected. Both algorithms were among the cryptographic techniques recommended for Japanese government use by CRYPTREC in 2003, however, both have been dropped to "candidate" by CRYPTREC revision in 2013.

The Hierocrypt ciphers are very similar, differing mainly in block size: 64 bits for Hierocrypt-L1, 128 bits for Hierocrypt-3. Hierocrypt-L1's key size is 128 bits, while Hierocrypt-3 can use keys of 128, 192, or 256 bits. The number of rounds of encryption also varies: Hierocrypt-L1 uses 6.5 rounds, and Hierocrypt-3 uses 6.5, 7.5, or 8.5, depending on the key size.

The Hierocrypt ciphers use a nested substitution–permutation network (SPN) structure. Each round consists of parallel applications of a transformation called the XS-box, followed by a linear diffusion operation. The final half-round replaces the diffusion with a simple post-whitening. The XS-box, which is shared by the two algorithms, is itself an SPN, consisting of a subkey XOR, an S-box lookup, a linear diffusion, another subkey XOR, and another S-box lookup. The diffusion operations use two MDS matrices, and there is a single 8×8-bit S-box. The key schedule uses the binary expansions of the square roots of some small integers as a source of "nothing up my sleeve numbers".

No analysis of the full ciphers has been announced, but certain weaknesses were discovered in the Hierocrypt key schedule, linear relationships between the master key and some subkeys. There has also been some success applying integral cryptanalysis to reduced-round Hierocrypt variants; attacks faster than exhaustive search have been found for 3.5 rounds of each cipher.
