= Pike (cipher) =

Stream cipher

The Pike stream cipher was invented by Ross Anderson to be a "leaner and meaner" version of FISH after he broke FISH in 1994. Its name is supposed to be a humorous allusion to the pike fish.

The cipher combines ideas from A5 with the lagged Fibonacci generators used in FISH. It is about 10% faster than FISH, yet believed to be much stronger. It potentially has a huge key length, and no attacks have been published as of 2004.

== Description ==
Pike consists of three lagged Fibonacci generators with relations
$$\begin{align}
a_i = a_{i-55} + a_{i-24} \ (mod \ 2^{32}) \\[]
b_i = b_{i-57} + b_{i-7} \ (mod \ 2^{32}) \\[]
c_i = c_{i-58} + c_{i-19} \ (mod \ 2^{32})
\end{align}$$

The clock control is based on the carry bits. If all carry bits agree we step all three LFG's, otherwise we step the two who do agree. This control will be delayed 8 cycles.

The final output is the XOR of the least significant words of all three generators.
