= SHACAL =

Block cipher

General
- Designers: Helena Handschuh, David Naccache
- Derived from: SHA-1, SHA-256
- Related to: Crab
- Certification: NESSIE (SHACAL-2)

Cipher detail
- Key sizes: 128 to 512 bits
- Block sizes: 160 bits (SHACAL-1), 256 bits (SHACAL-2)
- Structure: Cryptographic hash function
- Rounds: 80

SHACAL-1 (originally simply SHACAL) is a 160-bit block cipher based on SHA-1, and supports keys from 128-bit to 512-bit. SHACAL-2 is a 256-bit block cipher based upon the larger hash function SHA-256.

Both SHACAL-1 and SHACAL-2 were selected for the second phase of the NESSIE project. However, in 2003, SHACAL-1 was not recommended for the NESSIE portfolio because of concerns about its key schedule, while SHACAL-2 was finally selected as one of the 17 NESSIE finalists.

== Design ==
SHACAL-1 is based on the following observation of SHA-1:

The hash function SHA-1 is designed around a compression function. This function takes as input a 160-bit state and a 512-bit data word and outputs a new 160-bit state after 80 rounds. The hash function works by repeatedly calling this compression function with successive 512-bit data blocks and each time updating the state accordingly. This compression function is easily invertible if the data block is known, i.e. given the data block on which it acted and the output of the compression function, one can compute that state that went in.

SHACAL-1 turns the SHA-1 compression function into a block cipher by using the state input as the data block and using the data input as the key input. In other words, SHACAL-1 views the SHA-1 compression function as an 80-round, 160-bit block cipher with a 512-bit key. Keys shorter than 512 bits are supported by padding them with zeros. SHACAL-1 is not intended to be used with keys shorter than 128 bits.

== Security of SHACAL-1 ==
In the paper "Related-key rectangle attack on the full SHACAL-1", 2006, Orr Dunkelman, Nathan Keller and Jongsung Kim presented a related-key rectangle attack on the full 80 rounds of SHACAL-1.

In the paper "Differential and Rectangle Attacks on Reduced-Round SHACAL-1", Jiqiang Lu, Jongsung Kim, Nathan Keller and Orr Dunkelman presented rectangle attacks on the first 51 rounds and a series of 52 inner rounds of SHACAL-1 and presented differential attacks on the first 49 rounds and a series of 55 inner rounds of SHACAL-1. These are the best currently known cryptanalytic results on SHACAL-1 in a single key attack scenario.

== Security of SHACAL-2 ==
In the paper "Related-Key Rectangle Attack on 42-Round SHACAL-2", Jiqiang Lu, Jongsung Kim, Nathan Keller, Orr Dunkelman presented a related-key rectangle attack on 42-round SHACAL-2.

In 2008 Lu and Kim presented a related-key rectangle attack on 44-round SHACAL-2. This is the best currently known cryptanalytic result on SHACAL-2.
