= LILI-128 =

Stream cipher

General
- First published: 2000

Cipher detail
- Key sizes: 128 bits
- Structure: LFSR

Best public cryptanalysis
- Broken in 1.61 hours on a notebook

LILI-128 is an LFSR based synchronous stream cipher with a 128-bit key. On 13 November 2000, LILI-128 was presented at the NESSIE workshop. It is designed to be simple to implement in both software and hardware.

In 2007, LILI-128 was totally broken by using a notebook running MATLAB in 1.61 hours.
