= Hyperchaos =

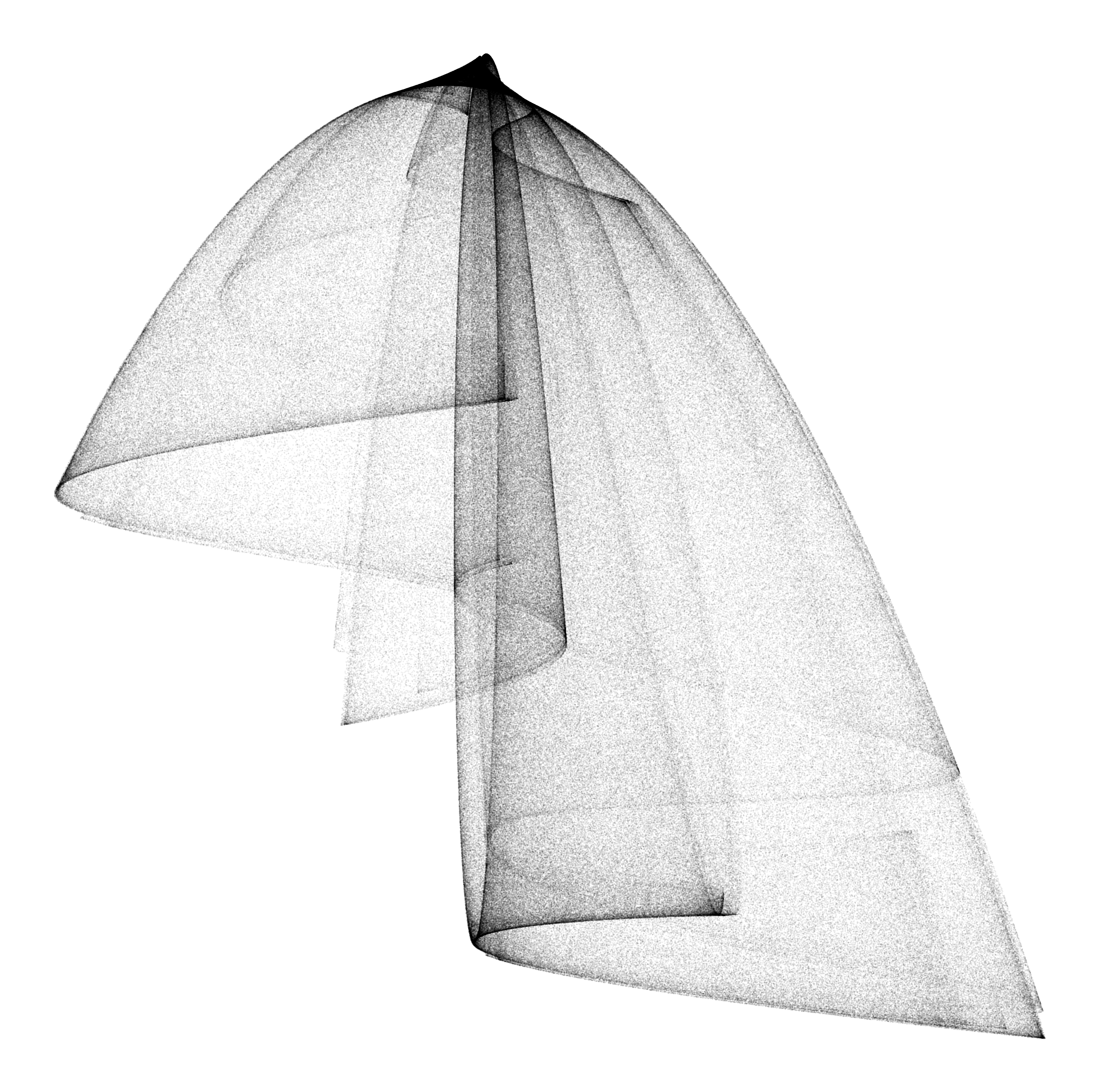
Folded-towel map attractor.

A hyperchaotic system is a dynamical system with a bounded attractor set, on which there are at least two positive Lyapunov exponents.

Since on an attractor, the sum of Lyapunov exponents is non-positive, there must be at least one negative Lyapunov exponent. If the system has continuous time, then along the trajectory, the Lyapunov exponent is zero, and so the minimal number of dimensions in which continuous-time hyperchaos can occur is 4.

Similarly, a discrete-time hyperchaos requires at least 3 dimensions.

== Mathematical examples ==
The first two hyperchaotic systems were proposed in 1979. One is a discrete-time system ("folded-towel map"):

$$\begin{aligned}
& x_{t+1}=3.8 x_t\left(1-x_t\right)-0.05\left(y_t+0.35\right)\left(1-2 z_t\right), \\
& y_{t+1}=0.1\left[\left(y_t+0.35\right)\left(1-2 z_t\right)-1\right]\left(1-1.9 x_t\right), \\
& z_{t+1}=3.78 z_t\left(1-z_t\right)+0.2 y_t .
\end{aligned}$$
Another is a continuous-time system:
$$\begin{array}{ll}
\dot{x}=-y-z, & \dot{y}=x+0.25 y+w, \\
\dot{z}=3+x z, & \dot{w}=-0.5 z+0.05 w .
\end{array}$$
More examples are found in.

== Experimental examples ==
Only a few experimental hyperchaotic behaviors have been identified.

Examples include in an electronic circuit, in a NMR laser, in a semiconductor system, and in a chemical system.

== Applications ==
Hyperchaotic systems have been investigated for applications that exploit their high dimensionality and extreme sensitivity to initial conditions, resulting from the presence of multiple positive Lyapunov exponents.

=== Secure communications and cryptography ===
One of the most extensively studied applications of hyperchaos is in secure communication and cryptography. Hyperchaotic signals have been used to mask information within broadband, noise-like waveforms, while message recovery is achieved through synchronization of identical hyperchaotic systems at the receiver. Compared with lower-dimensional chaotic systems, hyperchaotic systems generally offer increased resistance to phase-space reconstruction and parameter estimation attacks.

=== Electronic circuits and oscillators ===
Hyperchaos has been experimentally realized in electronic circuit implementations of nonlinear oscillators, enabling the study of high-dimensional chaotic dynamics and their robustness under physical constraints. Such circuit realizations are frequently used in demonstrations of hyperchaotic synchronization and communication schemes.

=== Image encryption and random number generation ===
Hyperchaotic maps and flows have been applied in image encryption and pseudorandom number generator design. Their sensitivity to initial conditions and parameter variations supports effective permutation and diffusion mechanisms in digital images and signals, particularly in proposed chaos-based cryptographic schemes.

=== Nonlinear systems and control ===
In physics and engineering, hyperchaotic systems are used as models of high-dimensional nonlinear system behavior and as test cases for synchronization, control, and stability analysis in complex dynamical networks.

== See also ==
- Chaos theory
