= Data Authentication Algorithm =

Message authentication code algorithm

The Data Authentication Algorithm (DAA) is a former U.S. government standard for producing cryptographic message authentication codes. DAA is defined in FIPS PUB 113, which was withdrawn on September 1, 2008. The algorithm is not considered secure by today's standards. According to the standard, a code produced by the DAA is called a Data Authentication Code (DAC). The algorithm chain encrypts the data, with the last cipher block truncated and used as the DAC.

The DAA is equivalent to ISO/IEC 9797-1 MAC algorithm 1, or CBC-MAC, with DES as the underlying cipher, truncated to between 24 and 56 bits (inclusive).
