= Panama (cryptography) =

Cryptography primitive

Panama (cipher)
General
- Designers: Joan Daemen, Craig Clapp
- First published: 16 October 1998
- Derived from: StepRightUp
- Successors: MUGI, RadioGatún, SHA-3
- Certification: size = 256 bits

Panama is a cryptographic primitive which can be used both as a hash function and a stream cipher, but its hash function mode of operation has been broken and is not suitable for cryptographic use. Based on StepRightUp, it was designed by Joan Daemen and Craig Clapp and presented in the paper Fast Hashing and Stream Encryption with PANAMA on the Fast Software Encryption (FSE) conference 1998. The cipher has influenced several other designs, for example MUGI and SHA-3.

The primitive can be used both as a hash function and a stream cipher. The stream cipher uses a 256-bit key and the performance of the cipher is very good reaching 2 cycles per byte.

== Hash function ==
Panama (hash)
Cipher detail
- Digest sizes: 256 bits
- Security claims: 2^{128} (collision resistance)
- Block sizes: 256 bits
- State size: 8736 bits

Best public cryptanalysis
- Panama hash collisions can be generated in 2^{6} time.

As a hash function, collisions have been shown by Vincent Rijmen et al. in the paper Producing Collisions for PANAMA presented at FSE 2001. The attack shows a computational complexity of 2^{82} and with negligible memory requirements.

At FSE 2007, Joan Daemen and Gilles Van Assche presented a practical attack on the Panama hash function that generates a collision in 2^{6} evaluations of the state updating function.

Guido Bertoni, Joan Daemen, Michaël Peeters, and Gilles Van Assche, at NIST's 2006 Second Cryptographic Hash Workshop, unveiled a Panama variant called RadioGatún. The hash function workings of RadioGatún does not have the known weaknesses that Panama's hash function has. In turn, RadioGatún inspired the new cryptographic standard SHA-3.

== See also ==
- Hash function security summary
