= BEAR and LION ciphers =

Block ciphers

The BEAR and LION block ciphers were invented by Ross Anderson and Eli Biham by combining a stream cipher and a cryptographic hash function. The algorithms use a very large variable block size, on the order of 2^{13} to 2^{23} bits or more. Both are 3-round generalized (alternating) Feistel ciphers, using the hash function and the stream cipher as round functions. BEAR uses the hash function twice with independent keys, and the stream cipher once. LION uses the stream cipher twice and the hash function once. The inventors proved that an attack on either BEAR or LION that recovers the key would break both the stream cipher and the hash.
