= Orthomorphism =

In abstract algebra, an orthomorphism is a certain kind of mapping from a group into itself. Let G be a group, and let θ be a permutation of G. Then θ is an orthomorphism of G if the mapping f defined by f(x) = x^{−1} θ(x) is also a permutation of G. A permutation φ of G is a complete mapping if the mapping g defined by g(x) = xφ(x) is also a permutation of G. Orthomorphisms and complete mappings are closely related.
