= Ross J. Anderson =

British computer scientist (1956–2024)

Ross J. Anderson FRS FRSE FREng FIMA FIET
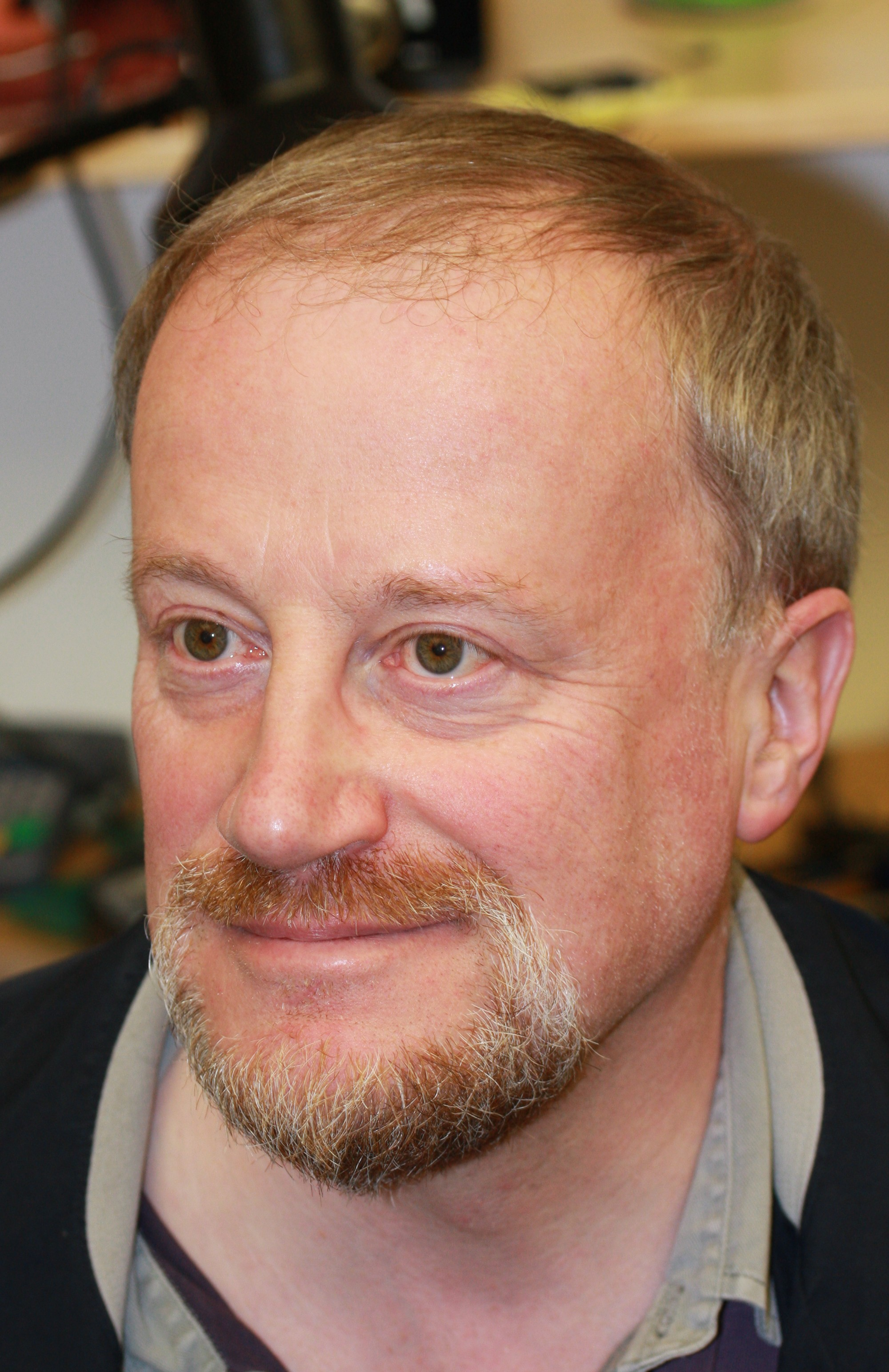
- Anderson in 2008
- Born: Ross John Anderson; 15 September 1956
- Died: 28 March 2024 (aged 67); Cambridge, England
- Education: High School of Glasgow; University of Cambridge (MA, PhD)
- Known for: Banking security; Security economics; Information policy; Serpent (cipher); University of Cambridge politics; Security Engineering book
- Spouse: Shireen Anderson
- Children: One
- Awards: Lovelace Medal (2015)
- Scientific career
- Fields: Computer science; Security; Cryptology; Dependability; Technology policy
- Workplaces: University of Cambridge; Department of Computer Science and Technology; Ferranti
- Thesis: Robust Computer Security (1995)
- Doctoral advisor: Roger Needham
- Doctoral students: Markus Kuhn; Robert Watson; George Danezis
- Website: www.cl.cam.ac.uk/~rja14/

Ross John Anderson (15 September 1956 – 28 March 2024) was a British researcher, author, and industry consultant in security engineering. He was Professor of Security Engineering at the Department of Computer Science and Technology, University of Cambridge where he was part of the University's security group.

== Education ==
Anderson was educated at the High School of Glasgow. After leaving school he attended Glasgow University and studied Natural Philosophy. He did not complete his studies there and moved to Cambridge. In 1978, he graduated with a Bachelor of Arts in mathematics and natural science from the University of Cambridge where he was an undergraduate student of Trinity College, Cambridge, and subsequently received a qualification in computer engineering. Anderson worked in the avionics and banking industry before moving back to the University of Cambridge in 1992, to work on his doctorate under the supervision of Roger Needham and start his career as an academic researcher. He received his PhD in 1995.

== Research and career ==
Anderson on Malware (2010)

Anderson was appointed a lecturer at Cambridge in 1995. In addition to teaching at the University of Cambridge, he also taught at the University of Edinburgh.

Anderson's research interests were in security, cryptology, dependability and technology policy. In cryptography, he designed with Eli Biham the BEAR, LION and Tiger cryptographic primitives, and co-wrote with Biham and Lars Knudsen the block cipher Serpent, one of the finalists in the Advanced Encryption Standard (AES) competition. He also discovered weaknesses in the FISH cipher and designed the stream cipher Pike.

Anderson always campaigned for computer security to be studied in a wider social context. Many of his writings emphasised the human, social, and political dimension of security. On online voting, for example, he wrote "When you move from voting in person to voting at home (whether by post, by phone or over the Internet) it vastly expands the scope for vote buying and coercion", making the point that it's not just a question of whether the encryption can be cracked.

In 1998, Anderson founded the Foundation for Information Policy Research, a think tank and lobbying group on information-technology policy.

Anderson was also a founder of the UK-Crypto mailing list and the economics of security research field.

Anderson was well known among Cambridge academics as an outspoken defender of academic freedoms, intellectual property and other matters of university politics. He was engaged in the "Campaign for Cambridge Freedoms" and had been an elected member of Cambridge University Council since 2002. In January 2004, the student newspaper Varsity declared Anderson to be Cambridge University's "most powerful person".

In 2002, he became an outspoken critic of trusted computing proposals, in particular Microsoft's Palladium operating system vision. However, Anderson's FAQ document attempting to explain trusted computing and its implications has been characterised by IBM TC researcher David R. Safford as "full of technical errors" and of "presenting speculation as fact."

For years Anderson argued that by their nature large databases will never be free of abuse by breaches of security. He said that if a large system is designed for ease of access it becomes insecure; if made watertight it becomes impossible to use. This is sometimes known as Anderson's Rule.

Anderson was the author of several editions of Security Engineering, which was initially published by Wiley in 2001. He was the founder and editor of Computer and Communications Security Reviews.

After Edward Snowden's vast global surveillance disclosures in June 2013, Anderson suggested one way to begin stamping out the British state's unaccountable involvement in this NSA spying scandal was to entirely end the domestic secret services: "Were I a legislator, I would simply abolish MI5". Anderson noted the only way this kind of systemic data collection was made possible was through the business models of private industry. The value of information-driven Web companies such as Facebook and Google is built around their ability to gather vast tracts of data. It was something the intelligence agencies would have struggled to do alone.

Anderson was a critic of smart meters, writing that there are various privacy and energy security concerns.

=== Awards and honours ===
Anderson was elected a Fellow of the Royal Society (FRS) in 2009. His nomination reads:

Professor Ross Anderson, Personal Chair in Security Engineering, Computer Laboratory, University of Cambridge.

Ross Anderson was a pioneer and world leader in security engineering, and is distinguished for starting a number of new areas of research in hardware, software and systems.

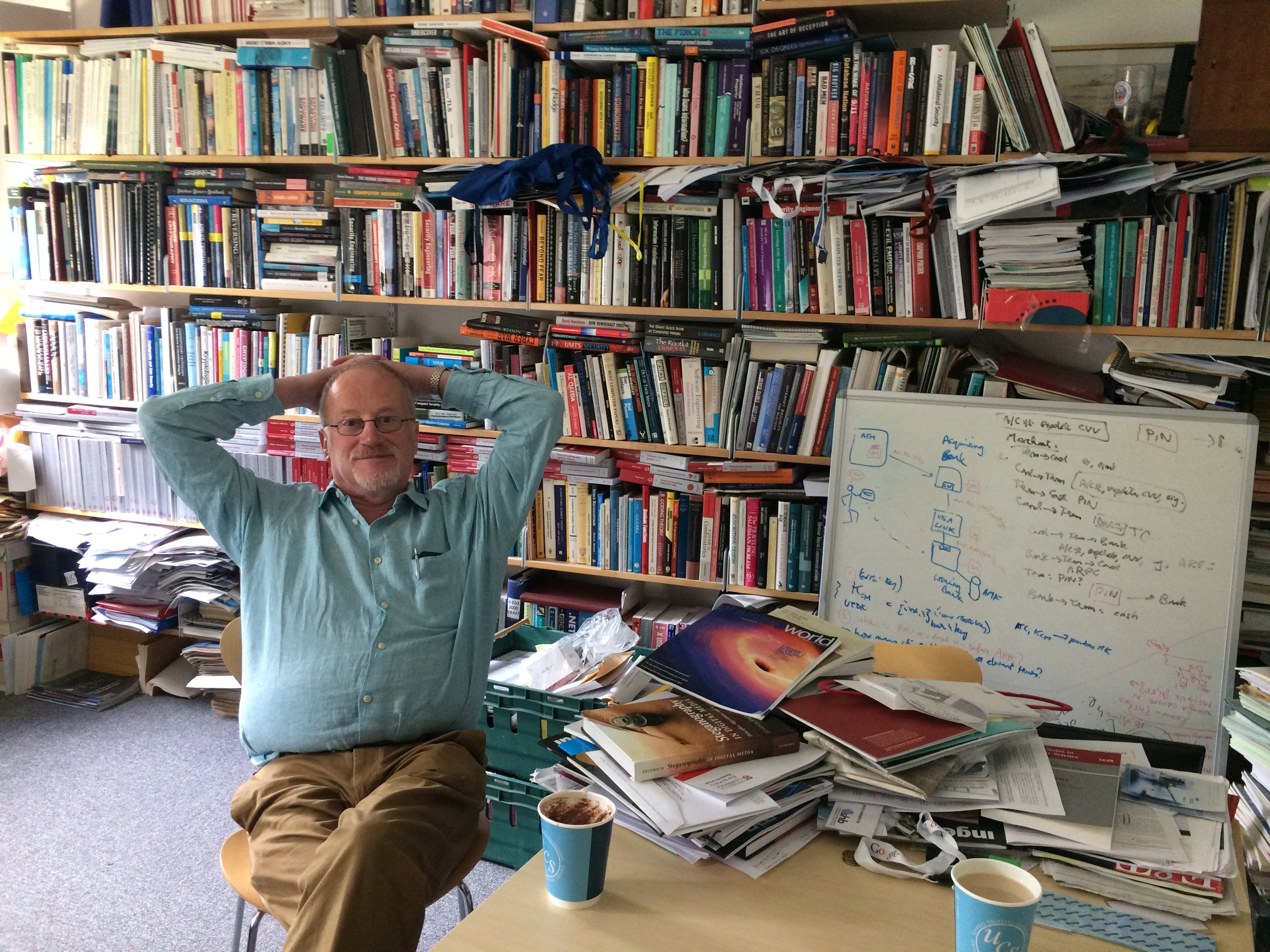
Ross Anderson in his office in Cambridge in 2018

His early work on how systems fail established a base of empirical evidence for building threat models for a wide range of applications from banking to healthcare.

Anderson made trailblazing contributions that helped establish a number of new research topics, including security usability, hardware tamper-resistance, information hiding, and the analysis of application programming interfaces.

Anderson was also one of the founders of the study of information security economics, which not only illuminates where the most effective attacks and defences may be found, but is also of fundamental importance to making policy for the information society.

Anderson was also elected a Fellow of the Royal Academy of Engineering (FREng) in 2009. He was a Fellow of Churchill College, Cambridge and awarded the BCS Lovelace Medal in 2015. Anderson was elected to the Royal Society of Edinburgh in 2023.

== Personal life and death ==
Anderson met his wife, Shireen, while he was working in Johannesburg and they were married in Cambridge in 1992. Shireen Anderson is the coordinator of the Christina Kelly Association, of Churchill College, Cambridge. They have one daughter, Bavani, and four grandchildren.

Anderson died unexpectedly at home with his family in Cambridge on 28 March 2024, at the age of 67.

== Security Engineering ==
By agreement with the publisher , the third edition of Ross Anderson's book Security Engineering was made available for download at the Cambridge University archive in November 2024.
