= IDEA NXT =

Block cipher

IDEA NXT (FOX)
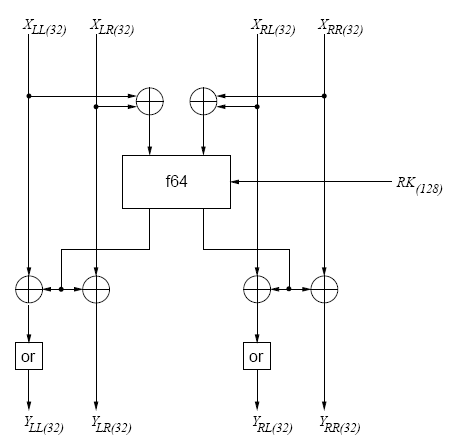
- Round function of NXT

General
- Designers: Pascal Junod, Serge Vaudenay
- First published: 2003
- Derived from: IDEA

Cipher detail
- Key sizes: 0-256 bits
- Block sizes: 64 or 128 bits
- Structure: Lai–Massey scheme
- Rounds: 16

Best public cryptanalysis
- Integral attack on 7 round NXT64 with time complexity of 2^{237.4} and on 5 round NXT128 with time complexity of 2^{205.6} by Wu Wenling, Zhang Wentao, and Feng Dengguo.

In cryptography, the IDEA NXT algorithm (previously known as FOX) is a block cipher designed by Pascal Junod and Serge Vaudenay of EPFL (Lausanne, Switzerland). It was conceived between 2001 and 2003. The project was originally named FOX and was published in 2003. In May 2005, it was announced by MediaCrypt under the name IDEA NXT. IDEA NXT is the successor to the International Data Encryption Algorithm (IDEA) and also uses the Lai–Massey scheme. MediaCrypt AG holds patents on elements of IDEA and IDEA NXT. The cipher is specified in two configurations: NXT64 (with block of 64 bits, key of 128 bits, 16 rounds) and NXT128 (with block of 128 bits, key of 256 bits, 16 rounds).
