= FISH (cipher) =

Stream cipher

The FISH (FIbonacci SHrinking) stream cipher is a fast software based stream cipher using Lagged Fibonacci generators, plus a concept from the shrinking generator cipher. It was published by Siemens in 1993. FISH is quite fast in software and has a huge key length. However, in the same paper where he proposed Pike, Ross Anderson showed that FISH can be broken with just a few thousand bits of known plaintext.
