= Joan Daemen =

Belgian cryptographer (born 1965)

- Born: 1965 (age 60–61); Achel, Limburg, Belgium
- Education: Katholieke Universiteit Leuven
- Known for: Rijndael, Keccak
- Scientific career
- Fields: Cryptography
- Workplaces: Radboud University
- Thesis: Cipher and Hash Function Design. Strategies based on linear and differential cryptanalysis (1995)
- Doctoral advisor: Joos Vandewalle; René Govaerts

Joan Daemen (Dutch pronunciation: [joːˈɑn ˈdaːmə(n)]; born 1965) is a Belgian cryptographer who is currently professor of digital security (symmetric encryption) at Radboud University. He co-designed with Vincent Rijmen the Rijndael cipher, which was selected as the Advanced Encryption Standard (AES) in 2001. More recently, he co-designed the Keccak cryptographic hash, which was selected as the new SHA-3 hash by NIST in October 2012. He has also designed or co-designed the MMB, Square, SHARK, NOEKEON, 3-Way, and BaseKing block ciphers. In 2017 he won the Levchin Prize for Real World Cryptography "for the development of AES and SHA3". He describes his development of encryption algorithms as creating the bricks which are needed to build the secure foundations online.

In 1988, Daemen graduated in electro-mechanical engineering at the Katholieke Universiteit Leuven. He subsequently joined the COSIC research group, and has worked on the design and cryptanalysis of block ciphers, stream ciphers and cryptographic hash functions. Daemen completed his PhD in 1995, at which point he worked for a year at Janssen Pharmaceutica in Beerse, Belgium. He subsequently worked at the BACOB bank, Banksys, Proton World and then STMicroelectronics.

For 2025 he was awarded the BBVA Foundation Frontiers of Knowledge Award in the category "Information and Communication Technologies" jointly with Vincent Rijmen.
