= 3-Way =

Block cipher

General
- Designers: Joan Daemen
- First published: 1994
- Successors: NOEKEON
- Related to: BaseKing

Cipher detail
- Key sizes: 96 bits
- Block sizes: 96 bits
- Structure: Substitution–permutation network
- Rounds: 11

Best public cryptanalysis

In cryptography, 3-Way is a block cipher designed in 1994 by Joan Daemen. It is closely related to BaseKing; the two are variants of the same general cipher technique.

3-Way has a block size of 96 bits, notably not a power of two such as the more common 64 or 128 bits. The key length is also 96 bits. The figure 96 arises from the use of three 32 bit words in the algorithm, from which also is derived the cipher's name. When 3-Way was invented, 96-bit keys and blocks were quite strong, but more recent ciphers have a 128-bit block, and few now have keys shorter than 128 bits. 3-Way is an 11-round substitution–permutation network.

3-Way is designed to be very efficient in a wide range of platforms from 8-bit processors to specialized hardware, and has some elegant mathematical features which enable nearly all the decryption to be done in exactly the same circuits as did the encryption.

3-Way, just as its counterpart BaseKing, is vulnerable to related key cryptanalysis. John Kelsey, Bruce Schneier, and David Wagner showed how it can be broken with one related key query and about $2^{22}$ chosen plaintexts.
