= Jennifer Seberry =

Australian cryptographer, mathematician, and computer scientist

- Born: 13 February 1944 (age 82); Sydney, Australia
- Other name: Jennifer Seberry Wallis
- Known for: LOKI cipher, HAVAL hash function, Hadamard matrices
- Title: Emeritus Professor, University of Wollongong
- Awards: IACR Fellow (2012) | Pearcey Medal (2020) | Euler Medal ICA (2023) | DSc honoris causa, La Trobe (2017)

Academic background
- Education: BSc, UNSW (1966) | MSc, La Trobe (1969) | PhD, La Trobe (1971)
- Doctoral advisor: Bertram Mond

Jennifer Roma Seberry (also published as Jennifer Seberry Wallis; born 13 February 1944 in Camperdown, Sydney) is an Australian cryptographer, mathematician, and computer scientist. She is an Emeritus Professor at the University of Wollongong. She was the first person to teach cryptology at an Australian university, the first woman Professor of Computer Science in Australia, and the first woman Reader in Combinatorial Mathematics in Australia. She is also the first higher-degree graduate in mathematics from La Trobe University and its first woman higher-degree graduate.

== Early life and education ==
Seberry was born on 13 February 1944 in Camperdown, Sydney. She grew up across several suburbs of Sydney including North Parramatta, Ryde, North Narrabeen, Rydalmere, and Smithfield. She attended Parramatta High School, which was at the time the only co-educational school in New South Wales where girls could study Physics Honours for the Leaving Certificate.

While completing her undergraduate degree, she taught maths and science at Loreto College in Kirribilli and at North Ryde High School. She also worked part-time as a computer programmer for Leo Computers Pty Ltd, entering the workforce at 19.

She received her Bachelor of Science from the University of New South Wales in 1966, then her Master of Science in 1969 and her Doctor of Philosophy in Computational Mathematics in 1971, both from La Trobe University. Her formal supervisor was Bertram Mond, though she worked closely with Professor George Szekeres of the University of New South Wales, who served as her de facto supervisor. She was La Trobes first higher-degree graduate in mathematics and its first woman higher-degree graduate. In 2017, La Trobe awarded her a Doctor of Science (honoris causa).

== Career ==
=== Early career — Newcastle and ANU (1971–1976) ===
After completing her doctorate, Seberry began her academic career as a lecturer at Canberra College of Advanced Education before moving to the University of Newcastle, where she took on a lecturing role. During this period, she was involved in establishing the Australian Conference on Combinatorial Mathematics and Combinatorial Computing in 1970. She also held a Senior Research Fellowship position at the Australian National University.

=== University of Sydney (1976–1987) ===
Seberry joined the University of Sydney in 1976 as a Lecturer in Applied Mathematics, progressing to Senior Lecturer and then Reader in Combinatorial Mathematics, becoming the first woman in Australia to hold the Reader title in this field. In 1980, she introduced cryptology teaching at the university, marking the first time the subject was taught at any Australian institution. She later transferred to the Department of Computer Science, where she oversaw honours-level research in computer security alongside Josef Pieprzyk.

=== University of Wollongong (1992–2015) ===
Seberry moved to the University of Wollongong in 1992, where she founded the Centre for Computer Security Research — one of the earliest such centres established in Australia. Her aim, as she described it, was to create a pool of computer security expertise available to both Australian businesses and the broader community. She became Head of Computer Science for two years and was Director of the Centre until her retirement in 2015, after which she was appointed Emeritus Professor.

=== Mentorship and research output ===
Over the course of her career, Seberry supervised 31 PhD candidates and produced close to 500 academic papers along with eight books. Including those mentored by her former students, her broader academic lineage totals 71 researchers. Among her notable doctoral students are Peter Eades, Mirka Miller, Deborah Street, Leisa Condie, Thomas Hardjono and Lawrie Brown.

== Service to the profession ==
In 1987, Seberry was a founding member of the University of Sydney Information Security Group, which later became the Australian Information Security Association (AISA). In 1990, she co-founded what became ASIACRYPT, one of the most important cryptography conferences in the Asia-Pacific region. [5She served as a Director of the IACR from 1990 to 1992.

== Awards and honours ==
Year	Award	Awarded by
2008	Gold Medal	Combinatorial Mathematics Society of Australasia
2012	Fellow (first Australian elected)	International Association for Cryptologic Research (IACR)
2015	Emeritus Professor	University of Wollongong
2017	Doctor of Science (honoris causa)	La Trobe University
2020	Pearcey Medal	Pearcey Foundation
2023	Euler Medal	Institute of Combinatorics and its Applications (ICA)

== Research ==
=== Cryptographic algorithms ===
In 1989, Seberry worked with Lawrie Brown and Josef Pieprzyk to design the LOKI block cipher family at ADFA. LOKI89 was proposed as a successor to DES, and improved versions LOKI91 and LOKI97 followed. In 1992, she co-invented HAVAL, a hash function with variable output lengths from 128 to 256 bits, together with Yuliang Zheng and Josef Pieprzyk. In 2005, she co-designed the Py stream cipher (also called Roo) with Eli Biham, which was submitted to the eSTREAM competition.

=== Combinatorial mathematics ===
Seberry has made contributions to Hadamard matrices, orthogonal designs, weighing matrices, Bhaskar Rao designs, and bent functions. This work has found applications in CDMA telecommunications and cryptographic design. As of 2024, her published work has over 10,000 citations and an h-index of 43.

== Selected publications ==
=== Books ===
- Geramita, A. V. and Seberry, J. (1979). Orthogonal Designs: Quadratic Forms and Hadamard Matrices. Marcel Dekker.
- Pieprzyk, J. and Seberry, J. (1989). Cryptography: An Introduction to Computer Security, Prentice Hall.
- Pieprzyk, J., Hardjono, T. and Seberry, J. (2003). Fundamentals of Computer Security.Springer. ISBN 978-3-540-43101-7.
- Tran, L. C., Wysocki, T. A., Seberry, J. and Mertins, A. (2006). Complex Orthogonal Space-Time Processing in Wireless Communications. Springer. ISBN 978-0-387-29095-6.
- Seberry, J. (2018). Orthogonal Designs: Hadamard Matrices, Quadratic Forms and Algebras. Springer. ISBN 978-3-319-59032-5.
- Seberry, J. and Yamada, M. (2020). Hadamard Matrices: Constructions using Number Theory and Linear Algebra. John Wiley. ISBN 978-1-119-52024-4.

=== Selected papers ===
- Brown, L., Pieprzyk, J. and Seberry, J. (1990). LOKI: A cryptographic primitive. Auscrypt 1990, Springer-Verlag.
- Zheng, Y., Pieprzyk, J. and Seberry, J. (1993). HAVAL: A one-way hashing algorithm with variable length output. Auscrypt 1992, LNCS 718, pp. 83 to 104.
- Biham, E. and Seberry, J. (2005). Py (Roo): A Fast and Secure Stream Cipher. EUROCRYPT 2005 Rump Session.
