= CMEA =

CMEA may refer to:

- Comecon (the Council for Mutual Economic Assistance), 1949–1991, an economic organization under the leadership of the Soviet Union that comprised the countries of the Eastern Bloc along with a number of socialist states elsewhere in the world
- The Cellular Message Encryption Algorithm, a block cipher
- The Combat Methamphetamine Epidemic Act of 2005, a part of the renewal of the USA PATRIOT Act which restricts the sale of Methamphetamine precursor chemicals
- The Canadian Military Engineers Association, a professional association for military and civilian members of the military engineering branch of the Canadian Armed Forces
