= Yiqun Lisa Yin =

Chinese-American mathematician

Yiqun Lisa Yin (Chinese: 殷益群; pinyin: Yīn Yìqún) is a Chinese-American cryptographer and independent security consultant. Yin is known for breaking the SHA-1 cryptographic hash function, for developing the RC6 block cipher, and for her service as editor of the IEEE P1363 project for the standardization of public-key cryptography.

== Education and career ==
Yin was a student at Peking University from 1985 to 1989, and earned a bachelor's degree in applied mathematics there. She went to the Massachusetts Institute of Technology for graduate study, and completed her Ph.D. there in applied mathematics in 1994. Her dissertation, Teaching, Learning, and Exploration, concerned computational learning theory and online algorithms; it was supervised by Michael Sipser.

She worked as a researcher at RSA Laboratories from 1994 to 1999, and as director of security technologies at NTT's Palo Alto Laboratory for Multimedia Communications from 1999 to 2002, before becoming an independent consultant. She also worked as a visiting researcher at Princeton University and Tsinghua University. From 2016 to 2019, Yin was the chief security officer and chief cryptographer of Symbiont.

== Contributions ==
Yin was the editor of the IEEE P1363 project for the standardization of public-key cryptography. With Ron Rivest, Matt Robshaw, and Ray Sidney, she was one of the designers of RC6, a block cipher with symmetric keys that was one of five finalists for the 1997–2000 Advanced Encryption Standard competition.

In 2005, with Wang Xiaoyun and Hongbo Yu, Yin demonstrated an unexpected high probability of collisions (two different data values with the same hash) in the SHA-1 cryptographic hash function, originally designed by the National Security Agency. Their work caused SHA-1 to be considered as broken, and it has since fallen out of use.
