= Oryx (disambiguation) =

Oryx is an antelope genus.

Oryx or ORYX may also refer to:

== Biology and medicine ==
- ORYX, The Joint Commission performance measurement initiative (healthcare)

== Fiction ==
- Oryx, one of the title characters of the 2003 Margaret Atwood novel Oryx and Crake
- Oryx, name of the antagonist in the Destiny: The Taken King expansion of the video game Destiny
- Oryx, the antagonist in the MMORPG Realm of the Mad God
- Cthulhu Mythos deities § Oryx, an Elder god in the Cthulhu Mythos

== Geography ==
- Oryx (ancient city), an ancient city in Arcadia
- Oryx, a name of the 16th nome of ancient Upper Egypt, centered on what is now Minya, Egypt

== Media ==
- Oryx (journal), a scientific journal of conservation biology
- Oryx (website), an investigative OSINT research website, recently known for tracking equipment losses during the 2022 Russian invasion of Ukraine
- Oryx (publisher), an imprint subsumed by Greenwood Publishing

== Sports ==
- Oryx Douala, a football club from Douala, Cameroon

== Technology ==
- Atlas Oryx, a helicopter
- Oryx, the in-flight entertainment system on Qatar Airways
- Sea Oryx, a Taiwanese missile
- ORYX, an encryption algorithm
- ORYX GTL, a synthetic fuel plant in Qatar

== See also ==
- Orix, a Japanese financial company
