= William Stone Weedon =

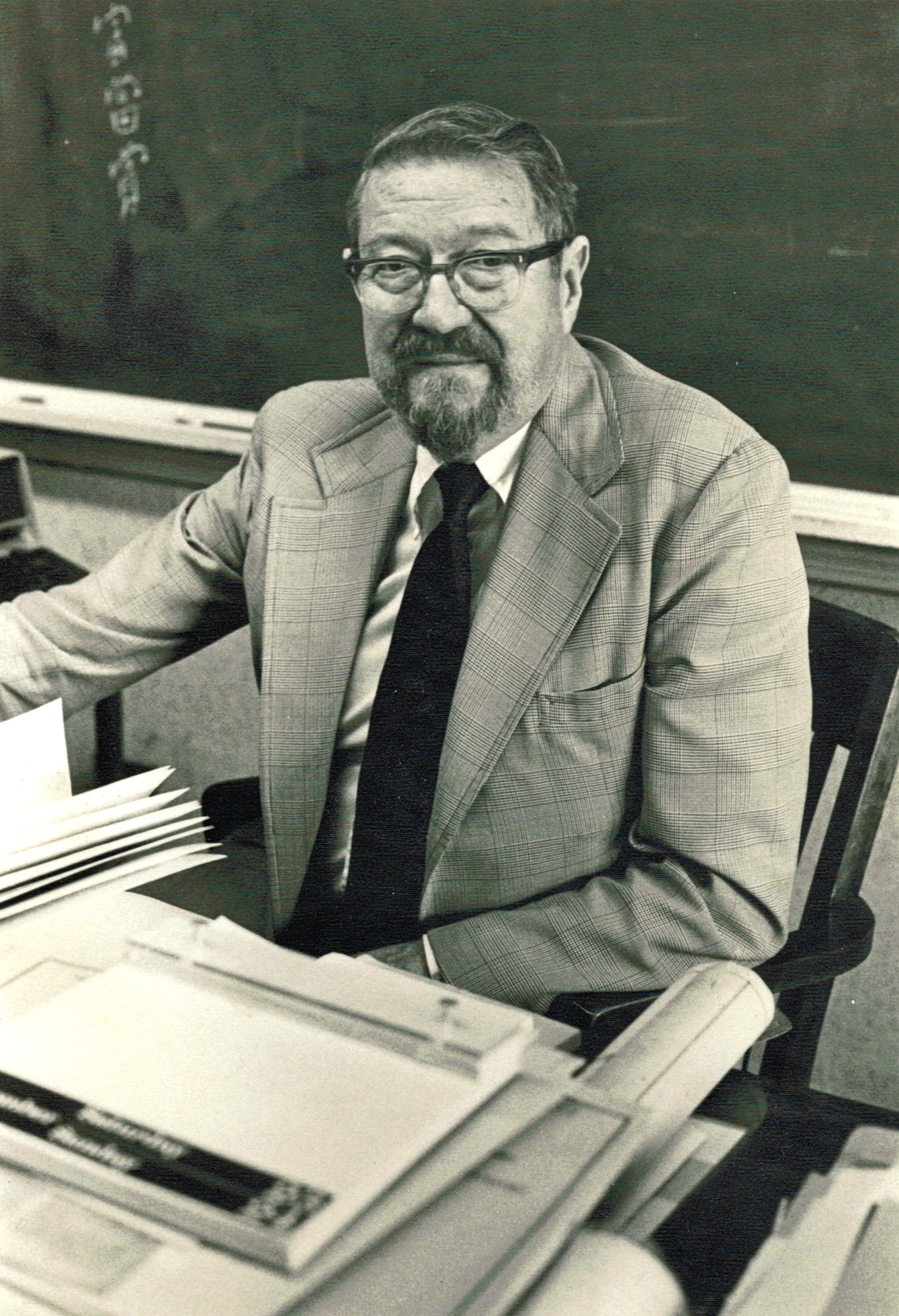
Professor William Stone Weedon

William Stone Weedon (July 5, 1908 – May 13, 1984), was a scholar, university professor (philosophy, mathematics, logic, linguistic analysis), and U.S. Navy Officer.

== Early life and education ==
Weedon was born in 1908 in Wilmington, Delaware, the only son of William Stone Weedon Sr. and Mary C. Weedon. His father, a chemist, died when his son William Jr. was only four. His young son William showed much promise in the arts and was able to sketch quite deftly what his eyes observed before the age of 10.

He held a Ph.D. from University of Virginia as well as an M.S. from Harvard and Wesleyan Universities. At Harvard he studied under Alfred North Whitehead as a Special Scholar.

== University teaching ==
Mr. Weedon taught many subjects at The University of Virginia and Wesleyan. Later on he would join the faculty at UVA and teach disciplines ranging from Mathematics to Philosophy. He was the recipient of the Algernon Sydney Award, the university's Raven Award, and the Thomas Jefferson Award. In 1963 Dr. Weedon assumed the professorship of 'University Professor' at UVA - an honor which enabled him to teach a broad range of disciplines throughout the university. Dr Weedon was a vocal proponent of developing seminars in the liberal arts at UVA, and he especially was interested in the largely unexplored connections between Platonism and Asian Philosophies. Professor Weedon taught some classes using the R. L. Moore method. He would give a list of axioms for some abstract operation and challenge students to prove something with no hints given. This technique sharpened one's reasoning skills.

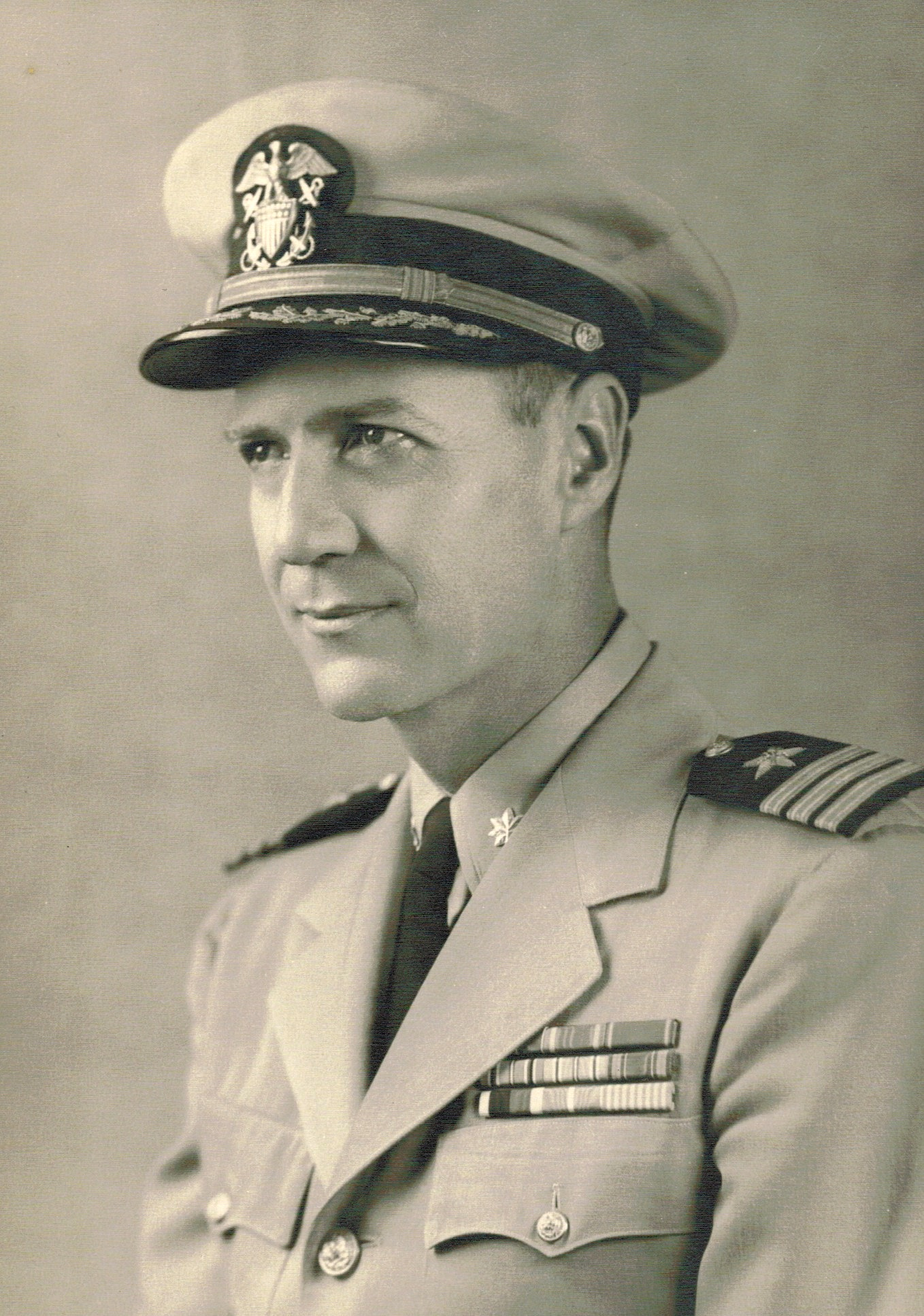
Commander William Stone Weedon

== Military career ==
Weedon was an officer in the United States Navy, and so his scholarly life was often interrupted by war service; he left his posts at universities to serve his country during World War II as well as the Korean War. In 1942 he received the rank of lieutenant, the rank of lieutenant commander in 1948, and eventually achieving the rank of captain in 1959. He earned The Bronze Star in World War 2 and was said to have saved his ship from bombing by intercepting Japanese Coded messages. He had the unusual ability as a westerner at that time of being able to understand and speak a variety of Asian languages. This led him to a team that was involved in cryptanalysis during World War II for the purposes of breaking enemy codes. During the Korean War, he participated in negotiations that would bring an end to the active conflict. His service to the United States would continue as a consultant on the far east on behalf of the Department of Defense for some years afterwards.

== Personal life ==
William Weedon married Elizabeth Dupont Bayard on June 25, 1934. They had four children and made their home in Charlottesville Virginia. In 1939, after their eldest daughter Ellen died unexpectedly at the age of 3, they created The Ellen Bayard Weedon Foundation in support of the Asian Arts. The Weedon Foundation is Non-Profit and regularly makes charitable grants to the Freer Gallery of Art, The Asia Society of New York, and the Virginia Museum of Fine Arts, among others. The focus of the foundation's grants was of particular interest to Dr. Weedon and he directed its annual funds towards furthering the West's understanding of the rich artistic traditions of India, China, Japan, and all of Asia's regions. A Weedon Professorship at UVA was created in 2010 with matching funds from the Ellen Bayard Weedon Foundation to support professorships in architecture, education, and nursing.

William Weedon was an individual not bound by conventions. He was a member of the Albemarle Garden Club at a time when the club had only one other male member. He won a Blue Ribbon Prize in a flower arrangement contest by placing a solitary rose inside a horse's skull. Mr. Weedon was also fond of self-effacing witticisms. When asked about his knowledge of languages he said he could "manage to get by in English."

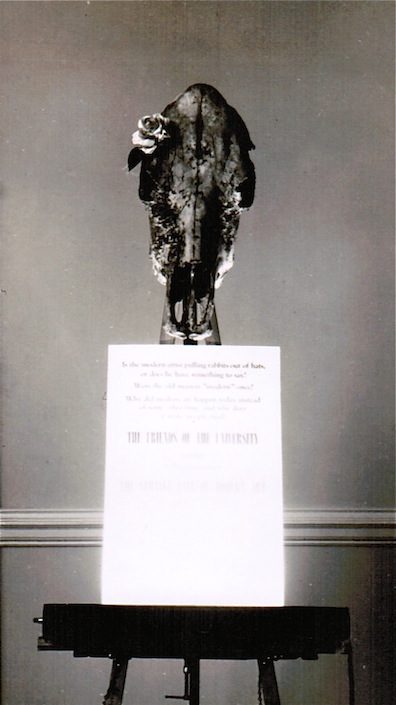
Blue Ribbon Prize Flower Arrangement Contest

He died in Charlottesville, Virginia at the age of 75 from cancer.
