= ORYX =

Stream cipher

ORYX is an encryption algorithm used in cellular communications in order to protect data traffic. It is a stream cipher designed to have a very strong 96-bit key strength with a way to reduce the strength to 32-bits for export. However, due to mistakes the actual strength is a trivial 16-bits and any signal can be cracked after the first 25–27 bytes.

It is one of the four cryptographic primitives standardized by TIA's for use in their digital cellular communications standards TDMA and CDMA.

== Algorithm description ==
ORYX is a simple stream cipher based on binary linear-feedback shift registers (LFSRs) to protect cellular data transmissions (for wireless data services).

The cipher ORYX has four components: three 32-bit LFSRs which labeled as LFSRA, LFSRB and LFSRK, and an S-box containing a known permutation P of the integer values 0 to 255.

The feedback function for LFSRK is defined as:
Lt + 32 = Lt + 28 ⊕ Lt + 19 ⊕ Lt + 18 ⊕ Lt + 16 ⊕ Lt + 14 ⊕ Lt + 11 ⊕ Lt + 10 ⊕ Lt + 9 ⊕ Lt + 6 ⊕ Lt + 5 ⊕ Lt + 1 ⊕ Lt

The feedback functions for LFSRA are defined as:
Lt + 32 = Lt + 26 ⊕ Lt + 23 ⊕ Lt + 22 ⊕ Lt + 16 ⊕ Lt + 12 ⊕ Lt + 11 ⊕ Lt + 10 ⊕ Lt + 8 ⊕ Lt + 7 ⊕ Lt + 5 ⊕ Lt + 4 ⊕ Lt + 2 ⊕ Lt + 1 ⊕ Lt

and
Lt + 32 = Lt + 27 ⊕ Lt + 26 ⊕ Lt + 25 ⊕ Lt + 24 ⊕ Lt + 23 ⊕ Lt + 22 ⊕ Lt + 17 ⊕ Lt + 13 ⊕ Lt + 11 ⊕ Lt + 10 ⊕ Lt + 9 ⊕ Lt + 8 ⊕ Lt + 7 ⊕ Lt + 2 ⊕ Lt + 1 ⊕ Lt

The feedback function for LFSRB is:
Lt + 32 = Lt + 31 ⊕ Lt + 21 ⊕ Lt + 20 ⊕ Lt + 16 ⊕ Lt + 15 ⊕ Lt + 6 ⊕ Lt + 3 ⊕ Lt + 1 ⊕ Lt

== See also ==
- A5/1, used in the GSM cellular telephone standard.
- CMEA, Cellular Message Encryption Algorithm.
