= Matt Robshaw =

Cryptographer

Matthew John Barton "Matt" Robshaw is a cryptographer. Formerly a lecturer at Royal Holloway, University of London and a member of the cryptography research group at France Telecom's Orange Labs, he is now a Technical Fellow at Impinj. He coordinated the Symmetric Techniques Virtual Lab (STVL) for ECRYPT. Robshaw's notable work includes the cryptanalysis of a number of cryptographic primitives, including the extension of linear cryptanalysis to use multiple approximations, and the design of the block ciphers Crab and RC6.

Robshaw received his Ph.D. in mathematics in 1992 from Royal Holloway, University of London.
