= Giovanni Soro =

Giovanni Soro (Venice, ? - 1544) was an Italian professional code-cracker. He was the Renaissance's first outstanding cryptanalyst and the Western world's first great cryptanalyst. Soro is known as the father of modern cryptography.

== Career ==
Soro was employed in Venice in 1506 by the Council of Ten as cipher breaker-in-chief. They were the first secret service specializing in codebreaking. Soro ran the cryptanalysis operation in secret as the cipher secretary. Soro's tasks included deciphering secret messages captured from the messenger spies of Venice's rivals. At the time, Venice was plagued by espionage and subterfuge. The Council of Ten had its own ciphers changed often so as to impede competitors such as François Viète, a French mathematician (the father of modern algebraic notation).

Successful diplomacy depended on knowing the adjacent principalities' thoughts and ideas. Soro was able to decipher the ciphers of most other courts. By 1510, he had forced most of them to develop their ciphers to a much higher degree of sophistication. As a result, the Papal Curia hired him to break codes that their own cipher analysts in Rome could not. Pope Clement VII often sent messages to Soro for cryptanalysis to test their impenetrability.

Soro's work in Venice continued to take priority over his work at the Vatican. He was Venice's principal cryptanalyst for almost 40 years. His work is among the earliest successful cryptanalysis which has been preserved. Soro's reputation was great among the leaders of other Italian city-states and Europe. He was so successful that he was given two assistants and a secret office in the Doge's Palace above the Sala di Segret by 1542. He made Venice a Renaissance bastion of diplomatic cryptology.

Soro wrote a treatise in Italian, French, Spanish, and Latin in the early 16th century on cryptography and solving ciphers which has since been lost.
