= Dynamic encryption =

Dynamic Encryption is a cryptographic principle that enables two parties to change the encryption algorithm for every transaction.

== Introduction ==
The principle of Dynamic Encryption was invented by Professor Lars R. Knudsen at the Technical University of Denmark. The Dynamic Encryption principle is patented.

In traditional cryptosystems a specific cipher is chosen thus security of the system relies on the frequency of key changes and the key agreement scheme. Dynamic Encryption enhances such a system by defining a set of ciphers such that not only the key but also the cipher changes on every new data transaction. Which follows the motivation of the Moving Target Defense paradigm.

In order to establish an encrypted channel using the Dynamic Encryption principle the sender and receiver first negotiates a key and then the sender picks a cipher from a large pool of ciphers and sends that together with the encrypted message.

It is possible to construct a dynamic encryption system, from known ciphers (such as AES, DES, etc.), such that all encryption algorithms generated from this system are at least as secure as the static underlying cipher.

== Details ==
The exchanged cryptosystems do not have to be kept secret, but to avoid attackers modifying the transmitted encryption systems, the system should be transmitted over an authenticated channel.

== Applications ==
Dynamic Encryption is deployed by Dencrypt Talk, a voice communication and live-chat application for iOS and Android. Dencrypt Talk applies the principle by wrapping standard AES encryption with a dynamic layer which is changed for every phone call between two clients.

== Awards ==
In 2017, Dencrypt won NATO's Defence Innovation Challenge award in recognition of their deployment of Dynamic Encryption for voice communication.
