= Wireless Public Key Infrastructure =

Wireless Public Key Infrastructure (WPKI) is a technology that provides public key infrastructure functionality using a mobile Secure Element such as a SIM card. It can be used for example for two-factor authentication.
