= A5/2 =

Stream cipher

A5/2 is a stream cipher used to provide voice privacy in the GSM cellular telephone protocol. It was designed in 1992-1993 (finished March 1993) as a replacement for the relatively stronger (but still weak) A5/1, to allow the GSM standard to be exported to countries "with restrictions on the import of products with cryptographic security features".

The cipher is based on a combination of four linear-feedback shift registers with irregular clocking and a non-linear combiner.

In 1999, Ian Goldberg and David A. Wagner cryptanalyzed A5/2 in the same month it was reverse engineered, and showed that it was extremely weak – so much so that low end equipment can probably break it in real time.

In 2003, Elad Barkan, Eli Biham and Nathan Keller presented a ciphertext-only attack based on the error correcting codes used in GSM communication. They also demonstrated a vulnerability in the GSM protocols that allows a man-in-the-middle attack to work whenever the mobile phone supports A5/2, regardless of whether it was actually being used.

Since July 1, 2006, the GSMA (GSM Association) mandated that GSM Mobile Phones will not support the A5/2 Cipher any longer, due to its weakness, and the fact that A5/1 is deemed mandatory by the 3GPP association. In July 2007, the 3GPP has approved a change request to prohibit the implementation of A5/2 in any new mobile phones, stating: "It is mandatory for A5/1 and non encrypted mode to be implemented in mobile stations. It is prohibited to implement A5/2 in mobile stations." If the network does not support A5/1 then an unencrypted connection can be used.

== See also ==
- A5/1
- KASUMI, also known as A5/3
