= Prince (cipher) =

Block cipher

General
- Designers: Technical University of Denmark, INRIA, Ruhr University Bochum and NXP Semiconductors
- First published: 2012
- Derived from: AES, PRESENT

Cipher detail
- Key sizes: 128 bits
- Block sizes: 64 bits
- Structure: SPN
- Rounds: 11 (but 12 non-linear layers)

Best public cryptanalysis
- a single key can be recovered with a computational complexity of 2^{125.47} using the structural linear relations. In the related key setting, the data complexity is 2^{33} and the time complexity 2^{64}. Using related key boomerang attack the complexity is 2^{39} for both data and time.

Prince is a block cipher targeting low latency, unrolled hardware implementations. It is based on the so-called FX construction. Its most notable feature is the alpha reflection: the decryption is the encryption with a related key which is very cheap to compute. Unlike most other "lightweight" ciphers, it has a small number of rounds and the layers constituting a round have low logic depth. As a result, fully unrolled implementations are able to reach much higher frequencies than AES or PRESENT. According to the authors, for the same time constraints and technologies, PRINCE uses 6–7 times less area than PRESENT-80 and 14–15 times less area than AES-128.

== Overview ==
The block size is 64 bits and the key size is 128 bits. The key is split into two 64 bit keys $K_{0}$ and $K_{1}$. The input is XORed with $K_{0}$, then is processed by a core function using $K_{1}$. The output of the core function is xored by $K'_{0}$ to produce the final output ($K_{0}'$ is a value derived from $K_{0}$). The decryption is done by exchanging $K_{0}$ and $K'_{0}$ and by feeding the core function with $K_{1}$ xored with a constant denoted alpha.

The core function contain 5 "forward" rounds, a middle round, and 5 "backward" rounds, for 11 rounds in total. The original paper mentions 12 rounds without explicitly depicting them; if the middle round is counted as two rounds (as it contains two nonlinear layers), then the total number of rounds is 12.

A forward round starts with a round constant XORed with $K_{1}$, then a nonlinear layer $S$, and finally a linear layer $M$. The "backward" rounds are exactly the inverse of the "forward" rounds except for the round constants.

The nonlinear layer is based on a single 4-bit S-box which can be chosen among the affine-equivalent of 8 specified S-boxes.

The linear layer consists of multiplication by a 64x64 matrix $M'$ and a shift row similar to the one in AES but operating on 4-bit nibbles rather than bytes.

$M'$ is constructed from 16x16 matrices $M_{0}$ and $M_{1}$ in such a way that the multiplication by $M'$ can be computed by four smaller multiplications, two using $M_{0}$ and two using $M_{1}$.

The middle round consists of the $S$ layer followed by $M'$ followed by the $S^{-1}$ layer.

== Cryptanalysis ==
To encourage cryptanalysis of the Prince cipher, the organizations behind it created the "Prince challenge". Archived from the original on 2016-10-23.

The paper "Security analysis of PRINCE" presents several attacks on full and round reduced variants, in particular, an attack of complexity 2^{125.1} and a related key attack requiring 2^{33} data.

A generic time–memory–data tradeoff for FX constructions has been published, with an application to Prince. The paper argues that the FX construction is a fine solution to improve the security of a widely deployed cipher (like DES-X did for DES) but that it is a questionable choice for new designs. It presents a tweak to the Prince cipher to strengthen it against this particular kind of attack.

A biclique cryptanalysis attack has been published on the full cipher. It is somewhat inline with the estimation of the designers since it reduces the key search space by 2^{1.28} (the original paper mentions a factor 2).

The paper "Reflection Cryptanalysis of PRINCE-Like Ciphers" focuses on the alpha reflection and establishes choice criteria for the alpha constant. It shows that a poorly chosen alpha would lead to efficient attacks on the full cipher; but the value randomly chosen by the designers is not among the weak ones.

Several meet-in-the-middle attacks have been published on round reduced versions.

An attack in the multi-user setting can find the keys of 2 users among a set of 2^{32} users in time 2^{65}.

An attack on 10 rounds with overall complexity of 118.56 bits has been published.

An attack on 7 rounds with time complexity of 2^{57} operations has been published.

A differential fault attack has been published using 7 faulty cipher texts under random 4 bit nibble fault model.

The paper "New approaches for round-reduced PRINCE cipher cryptanalysis" presents boomerang attack and known-plaintext attack on reduced round versions up to 6 rounds.

In 2015 few additional attacks have been published but are not freely available.

=== Most practical attacks on reduced round versions ===
Number of rounds	Time	Data	Method
4	2^{43.4}	33	Meet-in-the-middle
4	5*2^{8}	80	Integral
5	2^{29}	96	Integral
6	2^{25.1}	30574	Differential cryptanalysis
6	2^{41}	393216	Integral
6	2^{34}	2^{32}	Boomerang
8	2^{50.7}	2^{16}	Meet-in-the-middle
