= QARMA =

QARMA (from Qualcomm ARM Authenticator) is a lightweight tweakable block cipher primarily known for its use in the ARMv8 architecture for protection of software as a cryptographic hash for the Pointer Authentication Code. The cipher was proposed by Roberto Avanzi in 2016. Two versions of QARMA are defined: QARMA-64 (64-bit block size with a 128-bit encryption key) and QARMA-128 (128-bit block size with a 256-bit key). The design of the QARMA was influenced by PRINCE and MANTIS. The cipher is intended for fully-unrolled hardware implementations with low latency (like memory encryption). Unlike the XTS mode, the address can be directly used as a tweak and does not need to be whitened with the block encryption first.

== Architecture ==
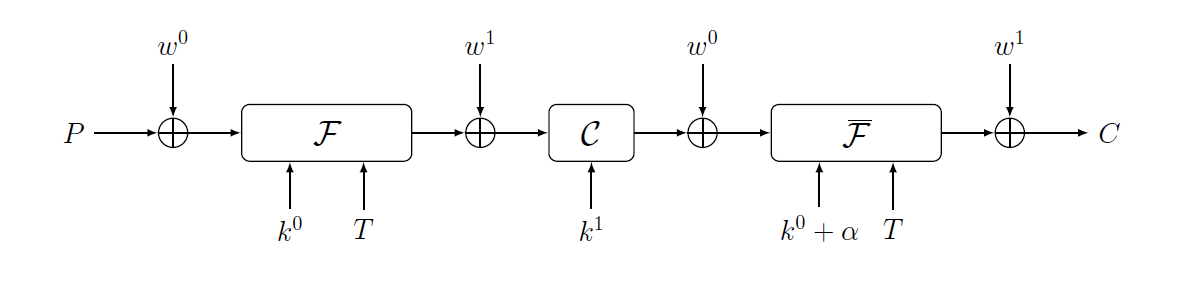
QARMA overview (an overbar indicates an inverse transformation)

QARMA is an Even–Mansour cipher using three stages, with whitening keys w^{0} and w^{1} XORed in between:

1. permutation F is using core key k^{0} and parameterized by a tweak T. It has r rounds inside (r = 7 for QARMA-64, r = 11 for QARMA-128);
2. "central" permutation C is using key k^{1} and is designed to be reversible via a simple key transformation (contains two central rounds);
3. the third permutation is an inverse of the first (r more rounds).

All keys are derived from the master encryption key K using specialisation:

- K is partitioned into halves as w^{0} Concatenation k^{0}, each will have halfsize bits;
- for encryption w^{1} = (w^{0} >>> 1) + (w^{0} >> (halfsize-1));
- for encryption k^{1} = k^{0};
- for decryption, the same design can be used as long as k^{0}+α is used as a core key, k^{1} = Q•k^{0}, w^{1} and w^{0} are swapped. α here is a special constant and Q a special involutary matrix. This construct is similar to the alpha reflection in PRINCE.

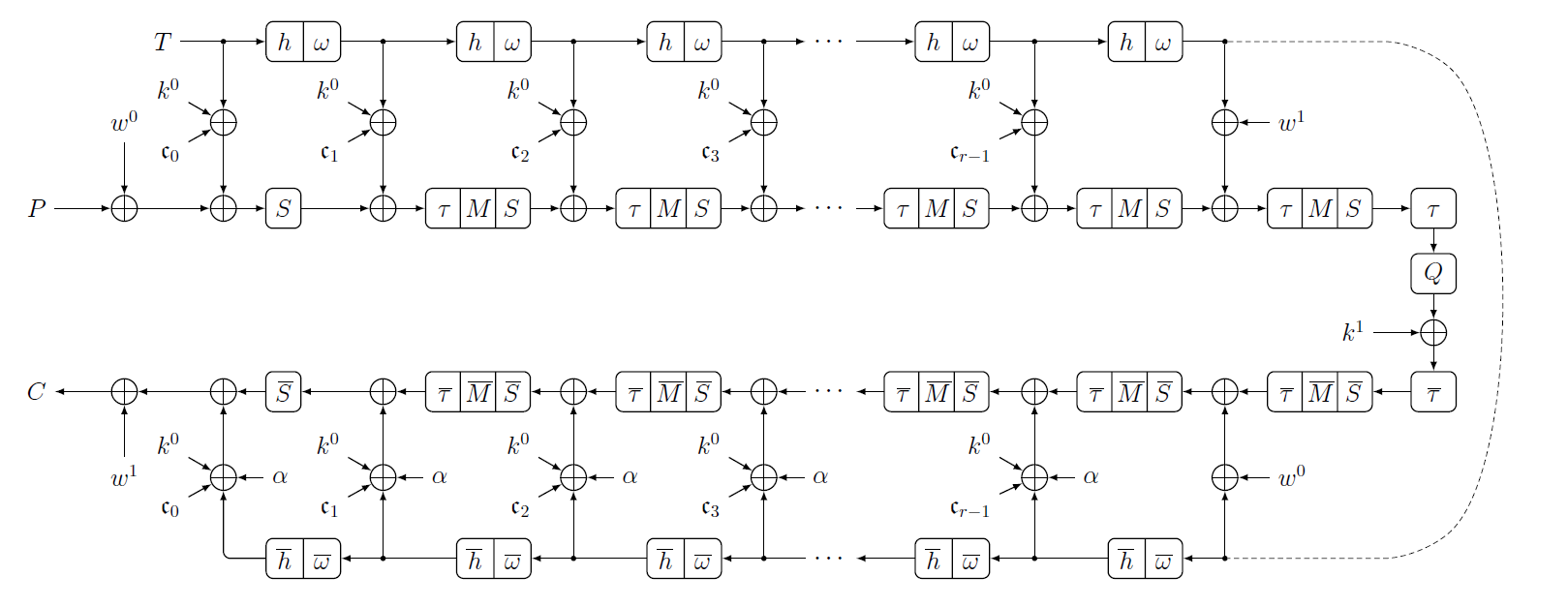
QARMA details. Rounds of $\digamma$ are at the top, rounds of $\overline \digamma$ are at the bottom, $C$ is on the right. Inner path describes the transformation of the internal state, outer path corresponds to the tweak update. c_{i} are round constants.

The data is split into 16 cells (4-bit nibbles for QARMA-64, 8-bit bytes for QARMA-128). Internal state also contains 16 cells, arranged in a 4x4 matrix, and is initialized by plaintext (XORed with w^{0}). In each round of $\digamma$, the state is transformed via operations $\tau, M, S$:

- $\tau$ is ShuffleCells, a MIDORI permutation of cells ([ 0, 11, 6, 13, 10, 1, 12, 7, 5, 14, 3, 8, 15, 4, 9, 2]);
- $M$ is MixColumns: each column is multiplied by a fixed matrix M;
- $S$ is SubCells: each cell is transformed using an S-box.

The tweak for each round is updated using $h, \omega$:

- $h$ is a cell permutation from MANTIS ([ 6, 5, 14, 15, 0, 1, 2, 3, 7, 12, 13, 4, 8, 9, 10, 11]);
- $\omega$ is an LFSR applied to each of the cells with numbers [0, 1, 3, 4, 8, 11, 13]. For QARMA-64, the LFSR is (b3, b2, b1, b0) ⇒ (b0 + b1, b3, b2, b1), for QARMA-128, (b7, b6, ..., b0) ⇒ (b0 + b2, b7, b6, ..., b1),

The rounds of $\overline \digamma$ consist of inverse operations $\overline \tau, \overline M, \overline S, \overline h, \overline \omega$. Central rounds, in addition to two rounds ($\tau, M, S$ and $\overline \tau, \overline M, \overline S$), include multiplication of the state by an involutary matrix Q.

== Sources ==
- Avanzi, Roberto (2016). The QARMA Block Cipher Family (PDF). IACR Transactions on Symmetric Cryptology (ToSC). Vol. 17 (published 8 March 2017). pp. 4–44. doi:10.13154/tosc.v2017.i1.4-44. Archived from the original (PDF) on May 13, 2020.
- Zong, Rui; Dong, Xiaoyang (2016). "Meet-in-the-Middle Attack on QARMA Block Cipher" (PDF). iacr.org. IACR.
- Kaur, Jasmin; Kermani, Mehran Mozaffari; Azarderakhsh, Reza (1 January 2022). "Hardware Constructions for Lightweight Cryptographic Block Cipher QARMA With Error Detection Mechanisms". IEEE Transactions on Emerging Topics in Computing. 10 (1): 514–519. doi:10.1109/TETC.2020.3027789. eISSN 2376-4562. S2CID 226665710.
- Li, Rongjia; Jin, Chenhui (4 May 2018). "Meet-in-the-Middle Attacks on Reduced-Round QARMA-64/128". The Computer Journal. 61 (8): 1158–1165. doi:10.1093/comjnl/bxy045. eISSN 1460-2067. ISSN 0010-4620.
- Yang, Dong; Qi, Wen-feng; Chen, Hua-jin (2018). "Impossible Differential Attack on QARMA Family of Block Ciphers". Cryptology ePrint Archive.
